Ace Books began publishing genre fiction in 1952. Initially these were mostly in the attractive tête-bêche format, but they also published a few single volumes, in the early years, and that number grew until the doubles stopped appearing in about 1978. The tête-bêche format was discarded in 1973, but future double novels were continued for a while,

Between 1952 and 1968, the books had a letter-series identifier; after that date they were given five-digit numeric serial numbers.  The list given here covers every Ace book that was not a double, published between 1952 and 1978 (or later), for all genres. It gives a date of publication; in all cases this refers to the date of publication by Ace, and not the date of original publication of the novels.  For more information about the history of these titles, see Ace Books, which includes a discussion of the serial numbering conventions used and an explanation of the letter-code system.

This list covers the non-double novels, for both the letter-series and numeric-series books. For the Ace Double volumes, see Ace Doubles.

D, G and S Series

 D-032 NA Dorothy Malone Cookbook for Beginners (1953)
 D-043 NA George S. Viereck and Paul Eldridge Salome: My First 2000 Years of Love (1953)
 S-054 NA Carl Offord The Naked Fear (1954)
 S-058 NA Joachim Joesten Vice, Inc. (1954)
 S-060 WE Samuel A. Peeples (as Brad Ward) The Marshal of Medicine Bend (1954)
 D-062 NA Ken Murray Ken Murray's Giant Joke Book (1954)
 D-065 NA Juanita Osborne Tornado Edward Kimbrough Night Fire (1954)
 S-066 SF L. Ron Hubbard Return to Tomorrow (1954)
 S-067 NA Robert Bloch The Will to Kill (1954)
 S-070 NA Rae Loomis Luisita (1954)
 S-074 NA Virginia M. Harrison (as Wilene Shaw) Heat Lightning (1954)
 S-075 NA Ralph E. Shikes (ed.) Cartoon Annual (1954)
 S-076 NA Émile Zola Shame (1954)
 S-080 NA Wilene Shaw The Fear and the Guilt (1954)
 S-082 WE Louis L'Amour Kilkenny (1954)
 S-083 MY Arnold Drake The Steel Noose (1954)
 S-085 NA Ernst-Maurice Tessier (as Maurice Dekobra) The Bachelor's Widow (1954)
 S-087 NA Noland Miller Why I Am So Beat (1955)
 D-088 NA Dexter Davis 7-Day System for Gaining Self-Confidence (1955)
 S-090 SF Robert Moore Williams The Chaos Fighters (1955)
 S-091 NA Stanley Baron End of the Line (1955)
 S-093 NA H. T. Elmo Modern Casanova's Handbook (1955)
 S-095 NA Harry Whittington The Naked Jungle (1955)
 S-097 MY Norman Hershman (as Norman Herries) Death Has 2 Faces (1955)
 S-100 NA Henry Lewis Nixon The Caves (1955)
 S-102 NA George Albert Glay Oath of Seven (1955)
 S-104 NA R.V. Cassill and Eric Protter Left Bank of Desire (1955)
 S-105 NA Edward De Roo The Fires of Youth (1955)
 S-107 NA C.P. Hewitt (as Peter Twist) The Gilded Hideaway (1955)
 S-108 NA Leslie Waller (as C. S. Cody) Lie Like a Lady (1955)
 D-110 SF Isaac Asimov The 1,000 Year Plan (1955)
 S-111 NA Harry Harrison Kroll The Smoldering Fire (1955)
 S-114 NA Edward Adler Living It Up (1955)
 S-116 NA Brant House Words Fail Me (1955)
 S-117 NA Kim Darien Dark Rapture (1955)
 S-119 NA Lawrence Easton The Driven Flesh (1955)
 D-121 SF Andre Norton The Stars Are Ours! (1955)
 S-122 NA Ledru Baker Jr. The Preying Streets (1955)
 S-124 NA Rae Loomis House of Deceit (1955)
 D-125 SF Isaac Asimov The Man Who Upset the Universe (1955)
 S-126 NA A.H. Berzen Washington Bachelor (1955)
 D-127 NA Robert Payne Alexander and the Camp Follower (1955)
 S-130 NA Sidney Weissman Backlash (1955)
 D-131 NA Eugene Wyble The Ripening (1955)
 S-132 NA Brant House (ed.) Cartoon Annual#2 (1955)
 S-133 SF Donald A. Wollheim (Ed.) Adventures on Other Planets (1955)
 S-136 NA R.V. Cassill A Taste of Sin (1955)
 S-137 NA Ralph Jackson Violent Night (1955)
 S-140 NA H. T. Elmo Honeymoon Humor (1956)
 S-141 NA Oliver Crawford Blood on the Branches (1956)
 S-142 NA Glenn M. Barns Masquerade in Blue (1956)
 S-143 NA Harry Whittington A Woman on the Place (1956)
 S-145 NA Brant House (ed.) Little Monsters (1956)
 D-146 SF Will F. Jenkins (as Murray Leinster) The Forgotten Planet (1956)
 S-148 WE Samuel A. Peeples (as Brad Ward) The Man from Andersonville (1956)
 S-151 NA Robert Novak Climb a Broken Ladder (1956)
 S-152 NA Henry Felsen Medic Mirth (1956)
 S-153 NA Hallam Whitney The Wild Seed (1956)
 D-154 NA Sloan Wilson Voyage to Somewhere (1956)
 D-155 SF Jules Verne A Journey to the Center of the Earth (1956)
 S-158 NA Kim Darien Golden Girl (1956)
 S-159 NA Jack Webb (as John Farr) She Shark (1956)
 S-161 NA E. Davis Gag Writer's Private Joke Book (1956)
 D-163 NA Russell Boltar Woman's Doctor (1956)
 S-165 NA Brant House (ed.) Love and Hisses (1956)
 D-169 SF Jack Williamson and James E. Gunn Star Bridge (1956)
 S-171 NA Eddie Davis (ed.) Campus Joke Book (1956)
 S-174 NA Robert Novak B-Girl (1956)
 D-175 NA Irving Settel (ed.) Best Television Humor of the Year (1956)
 D-178 NA Jean Paradise The Savage City (1956)
 S-179 NA Brant House (ed.) Squelches (1956)
 D-181 NA Arthur Conan Doyle and John Dickson Carr The Exploits of Sherlock Holmes (1956)
 S-183 SF Donald A. Wollheim (Ed.) The End of the World (1956)
 D-184 NA J. Mccague The Big Ivy (1956)
 D-187 SF A. E. van Vogt The Pawns of Null-A (1956)
 S-188 NA Brant House (ed.) They Goofed! (1956)
 S-190 NA Henry Lewis Nixon The Golden Couch (1956)
 D-191 NA Frank Slaughter Apalachee Gold (1956)
 D-194 NA Theodor Plievier Moscow (1956)
 S-198 NA William Bender Jr. Tokyo Intrigue (1956)
 D-200 NA Edward J. Ruppelt Unidentified Flying Objects (1956)
 D-202 NA Leonard Kauffman The Color of Green (1957)
 D-206 WE Robert Hardy Andrews Great Day in the Morning (1957)
 D-207 NA Charles Grayson Hollywood Doctor (1957)
 D-210 NA Stephen Longstreet The Lion at Morning (1957)
 D-211 SF Philip K. Dick Eye in the Sky (1957)
 D-212 NA H. T. Elmo Hollywood Humor (1957)
 D-213 NA Peter J. Steincrohn, M.D. How to Stop Killing Yourself (1957)
 D-214 NA Martin L. Weiss Hate Alley (1957)
 D-218 NA Sasha Siemel Tigrero! (1957)
 S-219 NA P.A. Hoover Backwater Woman (1957)
 D-222 NA R. Frison-Roche First on the Rope (1957)
 D-224 NA Shelby Steger Desire in the Ozarks (1957)
 D-228 NA David Howarth We Die Alone (1957)
 D-229 NA Walter Whitney Take It Out in Trade (1957)
 D-232 NA Willard Manies The Fixers (1957)
 D-233 SF S. B. Hough (as Rex Gordon) First on Mars (1957)
 D-234 NA Robert L. Scott Look of the Eagle (1957)
 D-238 NA Clellon Holmes Go (1957)
 D-239 NA G. Harry Stine Earth Satellite and the Race for Space Superiority (1957)
 D-243 NA Michael Wells The Roving Eye (1957)
 D-244 NA Terence Robinson Night Raider of the Atlantic: The Saga of the U-99 (1957)
 D-245 SF Jules Verne Off on a Comet (1957)
 D-246 NA John Harriman The Magnate (1957)
 D-250 NA Arthur Steuer The Terrible Swift Sword (1957)
 D-251 NA Hamilton Cochran Windward Passage (1957)
 D-254 NA Marcos Spinelli The Lash of Desire (1957)
 S-256 NA Karl Ludwig Oritz The General (1957)
 D-257 NA Louis Malley Tiger in the Streets (1957)
 D-258 NA Sławomir Rawicz The Long Walk (1957)
 D-261 SF Philip K. Dick The Variable Man and Other Stories (1957)
 S-262 NA Leland Jamieson Attack! (1957)
 S-263 NA Virginia M. Harrison (as Wilene Shaw) See How They Run (1957)
 D-267 NA Jim Bosworth Speed Demon (1958)
 D-268 NA Brant House (ed.) Lincoln's Wit, Humorous Tales and Anecdotes By and About Our 16th President (1958)
 D-269 NA Michael Powell Death in the South Atlantic (1958)
 D-270 NA Bud Clifton D for Delinquent (1958)
 D-271 NA Cliff Howe Lovers and Libertines (1958)
 D-274 SF David Mcilwain (as Charles Eric Maine) World Without Men (1958)
 S-275 NA Brant House (ed.) Cartoon Annual#3- The Cream of the Year's Best Cartoons (1958)
 D-278 NA Donald Barr Chidsey This Bright Sword (1958)
 D-280 NA James P.S. Devereux The Story of Wake Island (1958)
 D-281 NA Norman Vincent Peale (ed.) Guideposts (1958)
 D-282 NA Cliff Howe Scoundrels, Fiends, and Human Monsters (1958)
 D-283 SF Clifford D. Simak City (1958)
 D-287 NA Holland M. Smith Coral and Brass (1958)
 D-290 NA P. A. Hoover A Woman Called Trouble (1958)
 D-292 NA Booth Mooney The Insiders (1958)
 D-293 NA Väinö Linna The Unknown Soldier (1954)
 D-296 NA John Clagett Run the River Gauntlet (1958)
 D-300 NA J. Walter Small The Dance Merchants (1958)
 D-302 NA Maurice Druon The Iron King (1958)
 D-306 NA Peyson Antholz All Shook Up (1958)
 D-307 NA Brant House (ed.) From Eve On: Wit and Wisdom About Women (1958)
 D-309 SF H.G. Wells The Island of Dr. Moreau (1958)
 D-310 NA Marcos Spinelli Mocambu (1958)
 D-312 NA Harlan Ellison The Deadly Streets (1958)
 D-314 NA Blair Ashton Deeds of Darkness (1958)
 D-318 NA Donald Barr Chidsey Captain Crossbones (1958)
 D-319 NA Hans-Otto Meissner The Man With Three Faces (1958)
 D-323 NA Brant House The Violent Ones (1958)
 D-324 SF Ray Cummings Brigands of the Moon (1958)
 D-325 NA Irving Werstein July 1863 (1958)
 D-326 NA Wilhelm Johnen Battling the Bombers (1958)
 D-327 SF Jeff Sutton First on the Moon (1958)
 D-330 NA Bud Clifton Muscle Boy (1958)
 D-334 NA Stanley Johnston Queen of the Flat-Tops (1958)
 D-336 NA Samuel A. Krasney Morals Squad (1958)
 D-337 NA Jack Gerstine Play It Cool (1958)
 D-338 NA Edward De Roo The Fires of Youth (1958)
 D-339 SF Clifford D. Simak Ring Around the Sun (1958)
 D-340 SF Philip K. Dick Solar Lottery (1959)
 D-341 NA Rae Loomis The Marina Street Girls (1959)
 D-342 NA Nicholas Gorham Queen's Blade (1959)
 D-343 NA Edward de Roo The Young Wolves (1959)
 D-344 NA Gordon Landsborough Desert Fury (1959)
 D-350 SF Peter George (as Peter Bryant) Red Alert (1959)
 G-352 NA Francis Leary Fire and Morning (1959)
 D-353 NA Donald A. Wollheim (ed.) The Macabre Reader (1959)
 D-354 SF Donald A. Wollheim (Ed.) The Hidden Planet: Science-Fiction Adventures on Venus (1959)
 D-355 NA Bill Strutton and Michael Pearson The Beachhead Spies (1959)
 D-359 NA John Croydon (as John Cooper) The Haunted Strangler (1959)
 D-363 NA Samuel A. Krasney The Rapist (1959)
 D-364 NA Donald Barr Chidsey The Pipes Are Calling (1959)
 D-365 NA Robert Eunson MIG Alley (1959)
 D-366 SF Alan E. Nourse and J. A. Meyer The Invaders Are Coming (1959)
 D-370 NA Paul Ernst (as Ernest Jason Fredericks) Cry Flood (1959)
 G-371 NA Theodor Plievier Berlin (1959)
 D-374 NA Burgess Leonard The Thoroughbred and the Tramp (1959)
 G-376 NA J. Harvey Howells The Big Company Look (1959)
 D-377 SF Jeff Sutton Bombs in Orbit (1959)
 D-378 NA Virginia M. Harrison (as Wilene Shaw) Out for Kicks (1959)
 G-382 NA C. T. Ritchie Willing Maid (1959)
 D-383 NA David Stacton (as Bud Clifton) The Murder Specialist (1959)
 G-386 NA Richard O'Connor The Sulu Sword (1959)
 D-388 SF H. G. Wells When the Sleeper Wakes (1959)
 D-389 NA Cyril Henry Coles and Adelaide Manning (jointly as Manning Cole) No Entry (1959)
 G-390 NA R. Foreman Long Pig (1959)
 D-394 NA Donald Barr Chidsey The Flaming Island (1959)
 D-395 WE Allan Keller Thunder at Harper's Ferry (1959)
 D-396 NA Rae Loomis Luisita (1959)
 D-397 SF Jules Verne Journey to the Center of the Earth (1959)
 D-398 NA Noland Miller Why Am I So Beat (1959)
 D-399 NA Edward Adler Living It Up (1959)
 G-402 NA Daniel P. Mannix Kiboko (1959)
 D-404 NA Clifford Anderson The Hollow Hero (1959)
 D-405 SF S. B. Hough (as Rex Gordon) First to the Stars (1959)
 D-406 NA Edward Deroo Go, Man, Go! (1959)
 D-410 NA Donald Barr Chidsey Buccaneer's Blade (1959)
 D-411 MY Bob McKnight Swamp Sanctuary (1959)
 D-414 NA Alexandre Dumas The Companions of Jehu (1960)
 D-416 NA John Kenneth The Big Question (1960)
 D-417 NA Edward de Roo Rumble at the Housing Project (1960)
 D-420 NA John A. Williams The Angry Ones (1960)
 D-422 SF William A. P. White (as Anthony Boucher) and J. Francis Mccomas (eds.) The Best from F & SF, 3rd Series (1960)
 D-423 NA Browning Norton Tidal Wave (1960)
 D-426 NA Robert S. Close Penal Colony
 D-428 NA P.A. Hoover Scowtown Woman
 D-429 NA Charles Runyon The Anatomy of Violence (1960)
 D-432 NA Donn Broward Convention Queen (1960)
 D-434 NA Jules Verne The Purchase of the North Pole (1960)
 D-435 NA C.T. Ritchie Lady in Bondage (1960)
 D-438 NA Charles Fogg The Panic Button (1960)
 G-440 NA Andrew Hepburn Letter of Marque (1960)
 D-441 NA Lloyd E. Olson Skip Bomber (1960)
 D-444 NA Shepard Rifkin Desire Island (1960)
 D-446 NA Edward Moore Flight 685 Is Overdue (1960)
 D-452 NA Joe L. Hensley The Colour of Hate (1960)
 G-454 NA Anne Powers Ride East! Ride West! (1960)
 D-455 SF William A. P. White (as Anthony Boucher) (Ed.) The Best from Fantasy and Science Fiction, 4th Series (1960)
 D-458 NA Harry Wilcox (as Mark Derby) Womanhunt (1960)
 D-460 NA James Macgregor When the Ship Sank (1960)
 D-461 SF Andre Norton The Time Traders (1960)
 D-464 NA Virginia M. Harrison (as Wilene Shaw) Tame the Wild Flesh (1960)
 D-466 WE Richard O'Conner Wild Bill Hickok (1960)
 D-467 NA William C. Anderson Five, Four, Three, Two, One-Pfftt Or 12,000 Men and One Bikini (1960)
 D-468 SF Eric Frank Russell Sentinel of Space (1960)
 D-472 NA Harry Whittington A Night for Screaming (1960)
 D-473 SF Eric Temple Bell (as John Taine) The Greatest Adventure (1960)
 D-474 NA Leland Lovelace Lost Mines & Hidden Treasure (1960)
 D-475 WE Samuel A. Peeples (as Brad Ward) The Marshal of Medicine Bend (1960)
 D-478 SF Jeff Sutton Spacehive (1960)
 G-480 WE John Brick The Strong Men (1960)
 D-481 NA Joseph F. Dinneen The Biggest Holdup (1960)
 D-482 SF A. E. van Vogt The Weapon Shops of Isher (1961)
 D-486 NA Edward De Roo The Little Caesars (1961)
 D-487 NA Leonard Sanders Four-Year Hitch (1961)
 D-488 NA Dan Brennan Third Time Down (1961)
 D-490 SF Donald A. Wollheim (Ed.) Adventures on Other Planets (1961)
 D-493 NA Ellery Queen (ed.) The Queen's Awards, Fifth Series (1961)
 D-494 WE Leslie T. White Log Jam (1961)
 D-495 NA Samuel A. Krasney A Mania for Blondes (1961)
 D-498 SF Andre Norton Galactic Derelict (1961)
 G-500 WE George D. Hendricks The Bad Man of the West (1961)
 D-501 NA David Stacton (as Bud Clifton) Let Him Go Hang (1961)
 D-503 NA Frances Nichols Hanna (as Fan Nichols) The Girl in the Death Seat (1961)
 D-504 SF Jules Verne Master of the World (1961)
 D-506 NA Harry Harrison Kroll The Brazen Dream (1961)
 D-508 NA Donald A. Wollheim (ed.) More Macabre (1961)
 D-512 NA Donald Barr Chidsey Marooned (1961)
 D-513 NA Harlan Ellison The Juvies (1961)
 D-516 SF Otis Adelbert Kline The Swordsman of Mars (1961)
 D-518 NA Bill Miller and Robert Wade (as Wade Miller) Nightmare Cruise (1961)
 D-519 NA Carroll V. Glines and Wendell F. Moseley Air Rescue! (1961)
 D-520 NA Virginia M. Harrison (as Wilene Shaw) One Foot in Hell (1961)
 D-521 NA Margaret Howe The Girl in the White Cap (1961)
 D-522 NA Hal Ellson A Nest of Fear (1961)
 D-523 NA John Jakes (as Jay Scotland) Strike the Black Flag (1961)
 D-524 NA Maysie Greig (as Jennifer Ames) Overseas Nurse (1961)
 D-525 SF Will F. Jenkins (as Murray Leinster) This World Is Taboo (1961)
 D-526 NA Kim Darien Obsession (1961)
 D-527 SF Andre Norton Star Guard (1961)
 D-528 SF Will F. Jenkins (as Murray Leinster) The Forgotten Planet (1961)
 D-529 NA Leslie Turner White The Pirate and the Lady (1961)
 D-530 SF Robert Moore Williams The Day They H-Bombed Los Angeles (1961)
 D-531 SF Otis Adelbert Kline The Outlaws of Mars (1961)
 D-532 NA Isabel Capeto (as Isabel Cabot) Nurse Craig (1961)
 D-533 NA H. T. Elmo Mad. Ave. (1961)
 D-534 SF Andre Norton Daybreak - 2250 A. D. (1961)
 D-535 SF Ray Cummings The Shadow Girl (1961)
 D-536 NA Peggy Gaddis The Nurse and the Pirate (1961)
 D-537 SF H.G. Wells The Island of Dr. Moreau (1961)
 D-538 SF Isaac Asimov The 1,000 Year Plan (1961)
 D-539 NA Mary Mann Fletcher Psychiatric Nurse (1962)
 D-540 NA Arlene Hale School Nurse (1962)
 D-541 SF Alan E. Nourse Scavengers in Space (1962)
 D-542 SF Andre Norton The Last Planet (1962)
 D-543 NA Harriet Kathryn Myers Small Town Nurse (1962)
 D-544 SF Frank Belknap Long Space Station #1 (1962)
 D-545 NA Suzanne Roberts Emergency Nurse (1962)
 D-546 SF Andre Norton The Crossroads of Time (1962)
 D-547 SF John Brunner The Super Barbarians (1962)
 D-548 NA Dudley Dean Mcgaughty (as Dean Owen) End of the World (1962)
 D-549 NA Tracy Adams Spotlight on Nurse Thorne (1962)
 D-550 SF Poul Anderson No World of Their Own (1962)
 D-551 SF Peter George (as Peter Bryant) Red Alert (1962)
 D-552 NA Patricia Libby Hollywood Nurse (1962)
 D-553 NA William Hope Hodgson The House on the Borderland (1962)
 D-554 NA Jean Francis Webb (as Ethel Hamill) Runaway Nurse (1962)
 D-555 SF Jack Williamson The Trial of Terra (1962)
 D-556 NA Ruth Macleod A Nurse for Dr. Sterling (1962)
 D-557 NA Florence Stuart Hope Wears White (1962)
 D-558 NA Suzanne Roberts Campus Nurse (1962)
 D-559 NA Jane L. Sears Ski Resort Nurse (1962)
 D-560 NA Robert H. Boyer Medic in Love (1962)
 D-561 NA Ann Rush Nell Shannon R. N. (1963)
 D-562 NA Patricia Libby Cover Girl Nurse (1963)
 D-563 NA Arlene Hale Leave It to Nurse Kathy (1963)
 D-564 NA Harriet Kathryn Myers Prodigal Nurse (1963)
 D-565 NA Ray Dorlen The Heart of Dr. Hilary (1963)
 D-566 NA Suzanne Roberts Julie Jones, Cape Canaveral Nurse (1963)
 D-567 NA Isabel Moore A Challenge for Nurse Melanie (1963)
 D-568 SF Poul Anderson Star Ways (1963)
 D-569 NA Arlene Hale Dude Ranch Nurse (1963)
 D-570 WE L. L. Foreman Spanish Grant (1963)
 D-571 NA Katherine Mccomb Princess of White Starch (1963)
 D-572 WE Brian Garfield (as Frank Wynne) Arizona Rider (1963)
 D-573 WE Louis Trimble (as Stuart Brock) Whispering Canyon (1963)
 D-574 WE Louis L'Amour Kilkenny (1963)
 D-575 NA Peggy Dern A Nurse Called Hope (1963)
 D-576 NA Dorothy Karns Dowdell Border Nurse (1963)
 D-577 NA Sarah Frances Moore Legacy of Love (1963)
 D-578 WE Brian Garfield The Lawbringers (1963)
 D-579 NA Suzanne Roberts Hootenanny Nurse (1964)
 D-580 NA Arlene Hale Symptoms of Love (1964)
 D-581 NA Suzanne Roberts Co-Ed in White (1964)
 D-582 NA Joan Sargent My Love an Altar (1964)
 D-583 NA Tracy Adams Hotel Nurse (1964)
 D-584 NA Monica Edwards Airport Nurse (1964)
 D-585 NA Arlene Hale Nurse Marcie's Island (1964)
 D-586 NA Barbara Grabendike San Francisco Nurse (1964)
 D-587 NA Arlene Hale Nurse Connor Comes Home (1964)
 D-588 WE Merle Constiner Short Trigger Man (1964)
 D-589 NA Virginia B. Mcdonnell The Nurse With the Silver Skates (1964)
 D-590 WE Lin Searles Stampede at Hourglass (1964)
 D-591 NA Monica Heath (as Arlene J. Fitzgerald) Northwest Nurse (1964)
 D-592 WE Nelson Nye Gunslick Mountain (1964)
 D-593 NA Suzanne Roberts Sisters in White (1965)
 D-594 WE Louis Trimble The Desperate Deputy of Cougar Hill (1965)
 D-595 NA Ruth Macleod Nurse Ann in Surgery (1965)
 D-596 NA Arlene Hale Nurses on the Run (1965)
 D-597 WE L. P. Holmes The Hardest Man in the Sierras (1965)
 D-598 NA Arlene Hale Disaster Area Nurse (1965)
 D-599 NA Patricia Libby Winged Victory for Nurse Kerry (1965)

F Series

 F-105 SF William A. P. White (as Anthony Boucher) (ed.) The Best from Fantasy and Science Fiction, Fifth Series (1961)
 F-109 SF Andre Norton Storm Over Warlock (1961)
 F-114 SF Wallace West The Bird of Time (1961)
 F-118 NA Jacob O. Kamm Making Profits in the Stock Market (1961)
 F-123 SF Leigh Brackett The Nemesis from Terra (1961)
 F-131 SF William A. P. White (as Anthony Boucher) (ed.) The Best from Fantasy and Science Fiction, Sixth Series (1961)
 F-132 NA Mario Cappelli Scramble! (1962)
 F-135 SF Leigh Brackett The Long Tomorrow (1962)
 F-137 NA R. Dewitt Miller Impossible: Yet It Happened! (1962)
 F-140 NA Leonie St. John Love With a Harvard Accent (1962)
 F-146 NA John Jakes (as Jay Scotland) Sir Scoundrel (1962)
 F-151 NA Nedra Tyre Reformatory Girls (1962)
 F-154 SF A. E. van Vogt The Wizard of Linn (1962)
 F-156 SF Edgar Rice Burroughs At the Earth's Core (1962)
 F-157 SF Edgar Rice Burroughs The Moon Maid (1962)
 F-158 SF Edgar Rice Burroughs Pellucidar (1962)
 F-159 SF Edgar Rice Burroughs The Moon Men (1962)
 F-162 SF William A. P. White (as Anthony Boucher) (ed.) The Best from Fantasy and Science Fiction, Seventh Series (1962)
 F-163 NA Adele De Leeuw Doctor Ellen (1962)
 F-167 SF Andre Norton Catseye (1962)
 F-168 SF Edgar Rice Burroughs Thuvia, Maid of Mars (1962)
 F-169 SF Edgar Rice Burroughs Tarzan and the Lost Empire (1962)
 F-170 SF Edgar Rice Burroughs The Chessmen of Mars (1962)
 F-171 SF Edgar Rice Burroughs Tanar of Pellucidar (1962)
 F-174 SF S. B. Hough (as Rex Gordon) First Through Time (1962)
 F-175 NA Evelyn Berckman Lament for Four Brides (1962)
 F-178 SF Donald A. Wollheim (ed.) More Adventures on Other Planets (1963)
 F-179 SF Edgar Rice Burroughs Pirates of Venus (1963)
 F-180 SF Edgar Rice Burroughs Tarzan at the Earth's Core (1963)
 F-181 SF Edgar Rice Burroughs The Master Mind of Mars (1963)
 F-182 SF Edgar Rice Burroughs The Monster Men (1963)
 F-183 SF Andre Norton The Defiant Agents (1963)
 F-188 SF Philip Francis Nowlan Armageddon 2419 A.D. (1963)
 F-189 SF Edgar Rice Burroughs Tarzan the Invincible (1963)
 F-190 SF Edgar Rice Burroughs A Fighting Man of Mars (1963)
 F-191 SF Jules Verne Journey to the Center of the Earth (1963)
 F-192 SF Andre Norton Star Born (1963)
 F-193 SF Edgar Rice Burroughs The Son of Tarzan (1963)
 F-194 SF Edgar Rice Burroughs Tarzan Triumphant (1963)
 F-197 SF Andre Norton Witch World (1963)
 F-198 NA Simenon The Short Cases of Inspector Maigret (1963)
 F-201 SF Robert James Adam (as Paul Mactyre) Doomsday, 1999 (1963)
 F-202 NA Evelyn Berckman The Hovering Darkness (1963)
 F-203 SF Edgar Rice Burroughs The Beasts of Tarzan (1963)
 F-204 SF Edgar Rice Burroughs Tarzan and the Jewels of Opar (1963)
 F-205 SF Edgar Rice Burroughs Tarzan and the City of Gold (1963)
 F-206 SF Edgar Rice Burroughs Jungle Tales of Tarzan (1963)
 F-207 SF Andre Norton The Stars Are Ours! (1963)
 F-210 SF Peter George (as Peter Bryant) Red Alert (1963)
 F-211 SF Otis Adelbert Kline Planet of Peril (1963)
 F-212 SF Edgar Rice Burroughs Tarzan and the Lion Man (1963)
 F-213 SF Edgar Rice Burroughs The Land That Time Forgot (1963)
 F-216 SF Isaac Asimov The Man Who Upset the Universe (1963)
 F-217 SF William A. P. White (as Anthony Boucher) (ed.) The Best from Fantasy and Science Fiction, Eighth Series (1963)
 F-218 NA Allen Churchill They Never Came Back (1963)
 F-219 NA Henry Makow Ask Henry (1963)
 F-220 SF Edgar Rice Burroughs The People That Time Forgot (1963)
 F-221 SF Edgar Rice Burroughs Lost on Venus (1963)
 F-222 SF Jeff Sutton First on the Moon (1963)
 F-225 SF H. Beam Piper Space Viking (1963)
 F-226 SF Andre Norton Huon of the Horn (1963)
 F-231 SF Andre Norton Star Gate (1963)
 F-232 SF Edgar Rice Burroughs The Land of Hidden Men (1963)
 F-233 SF Edgar Rice Burroughs Out of Time's Abyss (1963)
 F-234 SF Edgar Rice Burroughs The Eternal Savage (1963)
 F-235 SF Edgar Rice Burroughs The Lost Continent (1963)
 F-236 SF Andre Norton The Time Traders (1963)
 F-239 SF Clifford D. Simak Time and Again (1963)
 F-240 SF H. G. Wells When the Sleeper Wakes (1963)
 F-241 SF Jack Williamson and James E. Gunn Star Bridge (1963)
 F-243 SF Andre Norton Lord of Thunder (1963)
 F-245 SF Edgar Rice Burroughs Back to the Stone Age (1963)
 F-246 SF Thea von Harbou Metropolis (1963)
 F-247 SF Edgar Rice Burroughs Carson of Venus (1963)
 F-248 SF Ray Cummings Beyond the Stars (1963)
 F-251 SF Philip K. Dick The Game-Players of Titan (1963)
 F-252 WE J. C. Bayliss (as John Clifford) The Shooting of Storey James (1964)
 F-255 SF Philip E. High The Prodigal Sun (1964)
 F-256 SF Edgar Rice Burroughs Land of Terror (1964)
 F-257 SF Fletcher Pratt Alien Planet (1964)
 F-258 SF Edgar Rice Burroughs The Cave Girl (1964)
 F-259 SF Otis Adelbert Kline Prince of Peril (1964)
 F-262 WE Clifton Adams Reckless Men (1964)
 F-263 SF Andre Norton Web of the Witch World (1964)
 F-266 WE Allan Vaughan Elston Roundup on the Yellowstone (1964)
 F-267 SF Robert P. Mills (ed.) The Best from Fantasy and Science Fiction, 9th Series (1964)
 F-268 SF Edgar Rice Burroughs Escape on Venus (1964)
 F-269 SF J. H. Rosny Quest of the Dawn Man (1964)
 F-270 SF Edgar Rice Burroughs The Mad King (1964)
 F-271 SF Edmond Hamilton Outside the Universe (1964)
 F-274 SF H. Beam Piper The Cosmic Computer (1964)
 F-277 SF John Brunner To Conquer Chaos (1964)
 F-278 NA Frances Spatz Leighton Patty Goes to Washington (1964)
 F-279 SF Andre Norton (as Andrew North) Sargasso of Space (1964)
 F-280 SF Edgar Rice Burroughs Savage Pellucidar (1964)
 F-281 SF Pierre Benoit Atlantida (1964)
 F-282 SF Edgar Rice Burroughs Beyond the Farthest Star (1964)
 F-283 SF Arthur Sarsfield Ward (as Sax Rohmer) The Day the World Ended (1964)
 F-286 WE Jim Bosworth The Long Way North (1964)
 F-287 SF Andre Norton The Key Out of Time (1964)
 F-288 NA Hal Sherman Fishing for Laughs (1964)
 F-290 WE D. B. Olsen Night of the Bowstring (1964)
 F-291 SF Andre Norton Plague Ship (1964)
 F-293 SF E. C. Tubb Moonbase (1964)
 F-294 SF Otis Adelbert Kline The Port of Peril (1964)
 F-295 SF A. E. van Vogt The World of Null-A (1964)
 F-296 SF Edwin L. Arnold Gulliver of Mars (1964)
 F-297 SF Henry Kuttner The Valley of the Flame (1964)
 F-300 WE Brian Garfield (as Brian Wynne Garfield) Vultures in the Sun (1964)
 F-301 SF Philip K. Dick The Simulacra (1964)
 F-302 WE Brian Garfield (as Frank Wynne) Dragoon Pass (1964)
 F-303 SF Marion Zimmer Bradley The Bloody Sun (1964)
 F-304 SF Roger Sherman Hoar (as Ralph Milne Farley) The Radio Beasts (1964)
 F-305 SF Robert E. Howard Almuric (1964)
 F-306 SF C. L. Moore and Henry Kuttner Earth's Last Citadel (1964)
 F-307 SF Gardner F. Fox Warrior of Llarn (1964)
 F-308 SF Andre Norton Judgment on Janus (1964)
 F-309 SF Philip K. Dick Clans of the Alphane Moon (1964)
 F-310 SF Andre Norton Galactic Derelict (1964)
 F-311 SF Donald A. Wollheim (ed.) Swordsmen in the Sky (1964)
 F-312 SF Roger Sherman Hoar (as Ralph Milne Farley) The Radio Planet (1964)
 F-313 SF Ray Cummings A Brand New World (1964)
 F-314 SF James H. Schmitz The Universe Against Her (1964)
 F-315 SF Andre Norton The Beast Master (1964)
 F-316 WE Robert McCaig The Burntwood Men (1964)
 F-317 SF James White The Escape Orbit (1965)
 F-318 SF Austin Hall The Spot of Life (1965)
 F-319 SF Edmond Hamilton Crashing Suns (1965)
 F-320 SF John Brunner (as Keith Woodcott) The Martian Sphinx (1965)
 F-321 SF Otis Adelbert Kline Maza of the Moon (1965)
 F-322 SF Samuel R. Delany City of a Thousand Suns (1965)
 F-323 SF Andre Norton Daybreak - 2250 A.D. (1965)
 F-324 WE Brian Garfield Apache Canyon (1965)
 F-325 SF Andre Norton Ordeal in Otherwhere (1965)
 F-326 SF Lin Carter The Wizard of Lemuria (1965)
 F-327 SF Henry Kuttner The Dark World (1965)
 F-328 SF Edward E. Smith The Galaxy Primes (1965)
 F-329 SF Andre Norton Storm Over Warlock (1965)
 F-330 SF Avram Davidson What Strange Stars and Skies (1965)
 F-331 NA Gahan Wilson Graveside Manner (1965)
 F-332 SF Andre Norton Three Against the Witch World (1965)
 F-333 SF L. Sprague de Camp Rogue Queen (1965)
 F-334 SF Rex Dean Levie The Insect Warriors (1965)
 F-335 SF Robert Moore Williams The Second Atlantis (1965)
 F-336 WE Ernest Hacox Six-Gun Duo (1965)
 F-337 SF Philip K. Dick Dr. Bloodmoney, Or How We Got Along After the Bomb (1965)
 F-339 NA Arlene Hale Private Duty for Nurse Scott (1965)
 F-340 WE John L. Shelley and David Shelley The Relentless Rider (1965)
 F-341 NA Suzanne Roberts A Prize for Nurse Darci (1965)
 F-342 SF H. Beam Piper Lord Kalvan of Otherwhen (1965)
 F-343 SF Ray Cummings The Exile of Time (1965)
 F-344 SF Henry Kuttner The Well of the Worlds (1965)
 F-345 SF Homer Eon Flint The Lord of Death and the Queen of Life (1965)
 F-346 SF John W. Campbell Jr. The Black Star Passes (1965)
 F-347 SF Ian Wright The Last Hope of Earth (1965)
 F-348 WE Nelson Nye Guns of Horse Prairie (1965)
 F-349 NA Suzanne Roberts Celebrity Suite Nurse (1965)
 F-350 SF Marion Zimmer Bradley Star of Danger (1965)
 F-351 WE Louis Trimble The Holdout in the Diablos (1965)
 F-352 NA Arlene Hale Nurse on Leave (1965)
 F-353 SF Avram Davidson Rogue Dragon (1965)
 F-354 SF Gardner F. Fox The Hunter Out of Time (1965)
 F-355 SF Homer Eon Flint The Devolutionist and the Emancipatrix (1965)
 F-356 SF Henry Kuttner The Time Axis (1965)
 F-357 SF Andre Norton Year of the Unicorn (1965)
 F-358 WE William Vance The Wild Riders of Savage Valley (1965)
 F-359 NA Sharon Heath Jungle Nurse (1965)
 F-360 WE L. L. Foreman Rawhiders of the Brasada (1965)
 F-361 SF John Brunner The Day of the Star Cities (1965)
 F-362 NA Suzanne Roberts The Two Dr. Barlowes (1965)
 F-363 SF Ray Cummings Tama of the Light Country (1965)
 F-364 SF John W. Campbell Jr. The Mightiest Machine (1965)
 F-365 SF Andre Norton Night of Masks (1965)
 F-366 SF Andre Norton The Last Planet (1965)
 F-367 SF Philip José Farmer The Maker of Universes (1965)
 F-368 NA Arlene Hale Chicago Nurse (1965)
 F-369 NA Samuel A. Peeples (as Samuel Anthony Peeples) The Lobo Horseman (1965)
 F-370 WE Samuel A. Peeples (as Brad Ward) The Man from Andersonville (1965)
 F-371 NA Arlene Hale Camp Nurse (1965)
 F-372 SF Edward E. Smith Spacehounds of IPC (1966)
 F-373 SF Jack Jardine and Julie Anne Jardine (jointly as Howard L. Cory) The Sword of Lankor (1966)
 F-374 SF Jeff Sutton The Atom Conspiracy (1966)
 F-375 SF Robert A. Heinlein The Worlds of Robert A. Heinlein (1966)
 F-376 WE Lewis B. Patten The Odds Against Circle L (1966)
 F-377 SF Philip K. Dick The Crack in Space (1966)
 F-378 NA Mary Mann Fletcher Danger - Nurse at Work (1966)
 F-379 SF Frank Herbert The Green Brain (1966)
 F-380 WE Lee Hoffman The Legend of Blackjack Sam (1966)
 F-381 NA Sharon Heath Nurse at Shadow Manor (1966)
 F-382 SF Brian W. Aldiss Bow Down to Nul (1966)
 F-383 SF Lin Carter Thongor of Lemuria (1966)
 F-384 NA L. P. Holmes The Savage Hours (1966)
 F-385 NA Arlene Hale Emergency for Nurse Selena (1966)
 F-386 SF Andre Norton The Time Traders (1966)
 F-387 NA Arlene Hale Mountain Nurse (1966)
 F-388 SF Samuel R. Delany Babel-17 (1966)
 F-389 WE William Colt MacDonald Shoot Him on Sight (1966)
 F-390 SF James Holbrook Vance (as Jack Vance) The Languages of Pao (1966)
 F-391 SF Andre Norton The Crossroads of Time (1966)
 F-392 SF Emil Petaja Saga of Lost Earths (1966)
 F-393 SF Roger Zelazny This Immortal (1966)
 F-394 NA Gail Everett Journey for a Nurse (1966)
 F-395 WE Nelson Nye Iron Hand (1966)
 F-396 SF Kenneth Bulmer Worlds for the Taking (1966)
 F-397 NA Willo Davis Roberts Nurse Kay's Conquest (1966)
 F-398 SF Eric Frank Russell Somewhere a Voice (1966)
 F-399 SF Gardner F. Fox Thief of Llarn (1966)
 F-400 SF Otis Adelbert Kline Jan of the Jungle (1966)
 F-401 WE Merle Constiner Outrage at Bearskin Forks (1966)
 F-402 SF Paul Linebarger (as Cordwainer Smith) Quest of the Three Worlds (1966)
 F-403 SF Roger Zelazny The Dream Master (1966)
 F-404 WE Clifton Adams The Grabhorn Bounty (1966)
 F-405 NA Suzanne Roberts Vietnam Nurse (1966)
 F-406 SF Ray Cummings Tama, Princess of Mercury (1966)
 F-407 SF Thomas Burnett Swann Day of the Minotaur (1966)
 F-408 SF Andre Norton The Sioux Spaceman (1966)
 F-409 WE Lin Searles Cliff Rider (1966)
 F-410 NA Arlene Hale Lake Resort Nurse (1966)
 F-411 WE L. L. Foreman The Mustang Trail (1966)
 F-412 SF Philip José Farmer The Gates of Creation (1966)
 F-413 NA Sharon Heath A Vacation for Nurse Dean (1966)
 F-414 SF Emil Petaja The Star Mill (1966)
 F-415 WE Brian Garfield (as Frank Wynne) The Bravos (1966)
 F-416 SF S. B. Hough (as Rex Gordon) Utopia Minus X (1966)
 F-417 NA Willo Davis Roberts Once a Nurse (1966)
 F-418 WE Nelson Nye Single Action (1967)
 F-419 NA Suzanne Roberts Rangeland Nurse (1967)
 F-420 SF Neil R. Jones Professor Jameson Space Adventure 1: The Planet of the Double Sun (1967)
 F-421 SF Donald E. Westlake (as Curt Clark) Anarchaos (1967)
 F-422 SF Leigh Brackett The Sword of Rhiannon (1967)
 F-423 WE Lewis B. Patten Giant on Horseback (1967)
 F-424 NA Arlene Hale Community Nurse (1967)
 F-425 SF Poul Anderson World Without Stars (1967)
 F-426 SF Gordon R. Dickson The Genetic General (1967)
 F-427 SF Samuel R. Delany The Einstein Intersection (1967)
 F-428 WE William Colt Macdonald Mascarada Pass (1967)
 F-429 SF Philip K. Dick The World Jones Made (1967)
 F-430 NA Arlene Hale Nurse on the Beach (1967)

M Series

 M-116 SF Robert P. Mills (ed.) The Best from Fantasy and Science Fiction, Tenth Series (1965)
 M-119 SF Jules Verne Journey to the Center of the Earth (1965)
 M-132 SF Robert W. Chambers The King in Yellow (1965)
 M-137 SF Robert P. Mills (ed.) The Best from Fantasy and Science Fiction, Eleventh Series (1965)
 M-142 SF H.F. Heard Doppelgangers (1965)
 M-143 SF John W. Campbell Islands of Space (1965)
 M-144 WE Ernest Haycox Trigger Trio (1966)
 M-145 NA Elizabeth Kellier The Patient at Tonesburry Manor (1966)
 M-146 NA anonymous (ed.) Cracked Again (1966)
 M-147 SF Andre Norton The Stars Are Ours! (1966)
 M-148 SF Andre Norton Star Born (1966)
 M-149 SF John Holbrook Vance (as Jack Vance) The Eyes of the Overworld (1966)
 M-150 SF Andre Norton The Defiant Agents (1966)
 M-151 SF Andre Norton The Last Planet (1966)
 M-152 SF H. Warner Munn King of the World's Edge (1966)
 M-153 SF A. E. van Vogt The Weapon Makers (1966)
 M-154 SF John W. Campbell Invaders from the Infinite (1966)
 M-155 SF Roger Zelazny Four for Tomorrow (1966)
 M-156 SF Andre Norton Key Out of Time (1966)
 M-157 SF Andre Norton Star Gate (1966)
 M-158 WE Brian Garfield (as Brian Wynne) The Proud Riders (1966)
 M-159 NA Sylvia Lloyd Down East Nurse (1966)
 M-160 WE Nelson Nye Trail of Lost Skulls (C. 1) (1966)
 M-161 NA Sharon Heath Nurse at Moorcroft Manor (1966)
 M-162 SF Donald A. Wollheim (as David Grinnell) Edge of Time (1966)
 M-163 NA Ray Hogan Wolver (1966)
 M-164 NA Suzanne Roberts Cross Country Nurse (1966)

G Series

 G-502 WE Richard O'Connor Pat Garrett (1965)
 G-504 NA Theodor Plievier Moscow (1965)
 G-505 NA Ken Murray Ken Murray's Giant Joke Book
 G-507 NA John M. Foster Hell in the Heavens
 G-510 MY Charlotte Armstrong Lewi (as Charlotte Armstrong) The Case of the Weird Sisters (1965)
 G-514 MY Charlotte Armstrong Lewi (as Charlotte Armstrong) Something Blue
 G-515 NA Sławomir Rawicz The Long Walk
 G-520 NA John Jakes (as Jay Scotland) Arena
 G-522 NA Frederick Faust (as George Challis) The Firebrand
 G-527 NA Frederick Faust (as George Challis) The Bait and the Trap (1965)
 G-532 NA John Jakes (as Jay Scotland) Traitors' Legion (1963)
 G-536 NA Helen Reilly The Day She Died
 G-537 NA Edward J. Ruppelt Unidentified Flying Objects (1965)
 G-538 NA Andre Norton Shadow Hawk (1965)
 G-540 MY Charlotte Armstrong Lewi (as Charlotte Armstrong) A Little Less Than Kind (1965)
 G-541 NA Jean Potts The Evil Wish
 G-542 NA Heidi Huberta Freybe Loewengard (as Martha Albrand) Meet Me Tonight (1965)
 G-544 NA Ruth Fenisong The Wench Is Dead (1964)
 G-545 NA Dana Lyon The Trusting Victim (1965)
 G-546 MY Helen Reilly Compartment K (1965)
 G-547 SF Austin Hall and Homer Eon Flint The Blind Spot (1965)
 G-548 MY Rohan O'Grady Let's Kill Uncle (1965)
 G-549 MY Ursula Curtiss The Iron Cobweb (1965)
 G-550 NA Theodora Du Bois The Listener (1965)
 G-551 SF Donald A. Wollheim and Terry Carr (eds.) World's Best Science Fiction: 1965 (1965)
 G-552 NA Theodora Du Bois Shannon Terror (1965)
 G-553 NA Michael Avallone The Man from U.N.C.L.E.
 G-554 NA Genevieve Holden The Velvet Target
 G-555 MY Ursula Curtis The Wasp (1963)
 G-556 NA Leonie St. John Love With a Harvard Accent (1963)
 G-557 MY Ursula Curtiss Out of the Dark
 G-558 NA Genevieve Holden Something's Happened to Kate
 G-559 NA Heidi Huberta Freybe Loewengard (as Martha Albrand) After Midnight (1965)
 G-560 NA Harry Whittington The Doomsday Affair (1965)
 G-561 MY Ursula Curtiss Widow's Web (1965)
 G-562 NA Helen McCloy The Long Body (1965)
 G-563 NA Heidi Huberta Freybe Loewengard (as Martha Albrand) A Day in Monte Carlo (1965)
 G-564 NA John Oram Thomas (as John Oram) The Copenhagen Affair (1965)
 G-565 MY Ursula Curtiss The Deadly Climate (1965)
 G-566 NA Irene Maude Swatridge and Charles John Swatridge (jointly as Theresa Charles) Lady in the Mist (1965)
 G-567 NA Theresa Charles The Shrouded Tower (1965)
 G-568 NA Melba Marlett Escape While I Can (1965)
 G-569 NA David Howarth We Die Alone (1965)
 G-570 SF Alan Garner The Weirdstone of Brisingamen (1965)
 G-571 NA David McDaniel The Dagger Affair (1965)
 G-572 NA Joy Packer The Man in the Mews (1966)
 G-575 NA Margaret Summerton Quin's Hide (1966)
 G-578 NA Dorothy Eden (as Mary Paradise) Shadow of a Witch (1966)
 G-581 NA John T. Phillifent The Mad Scientist Affair (1966)
 G-582 SF Jules Verne Journey to the Center of the Earth (1966)
 G-583 NA Marie Garratt Festival of Darkness (1966)
 G-586 SF William L. Chester Hawk of the Wilderness (1966)
 G-589 NA Margaret Summerton Ring of Mischief (1966)
 G-590 NA David McDaniel The Vampire Affair (1966)
 G-593 NA Dorothy Eden (as Mary Paradise) Face of an Angel (1966)
 G-594 NA Charles Runyon The Bloody Jungle (1966)
 G-595 SF Andre Norton Quest Crosstime (1966)
 G-598 NA Barbara James Bright Deadly Summer (1966)
 G-599 SF Andre Norton Star Guard (1966)
 G-600 NA Peter Leslie The Radioactive Camel Affair (1966)
 G-603 NA Carolyn Wilson The Scent of Lilacs (1966)
 G-604 NA Jess Shelton Daktari (1966)
 G-605 SF Jack Jardine (as Larry Maddock) The Flying Saucer Gambit - Agent of T.E.R.R.A.#1 (1966)
 G-608 NA Jean Potts The Only Good Secretary (1967)
 G-611 SF Avram Davidson (ed.) The Best from Fantasy and Science Fiction, Twelfth Series (1967)
 G-612 NA Leal Hayes Harlequin House (1967)
 G-613 NA David McDaniel The Monster Wheel Affair (1967)
 G-616 NA Marion Zimmer Bradley Souvenir of Monique (1967)
 G-617 NA Peter Leslie The Diving Dames Affair (1967)
 G-620 SF Jack Jardine (as Larry Maddock) The Golden Goddess Gambit - Agent of T.E.R.R.A.#2 (1967)
 G-621 NA Elizabeth Kelly (as Elizabeth Kellier) Matravers Hall (1967)
 G-624 NA Velma Tate (as Francine Davenport) The Secret of the Bayou (1967)
 G-625 SF Kenneth Bulmer To Outrun Doomsday (1967)
 G-626 SF Ursula K. Le Guin City of Illusions (1967)
 G-627 SF Fritz Leiber The Big Time (1967)
 G-628 WE Clifton Adams Shorty (1967)
 G-629 NA Elizabeth Kelly (as Elizabeth Kellier) Nurse Missing (1967)
 G-630 SF Andre Norton Warlock of the Witch World (1967)
 G-631 SF Neil R. Jones The Sunless World: Professor Jameson Space Adventure#2 (1967)
 G-634 SF Poul Anderson War of the Wing-Men (1967)
 G-635 NA Lena Brooke Mcnamara Pilgrim's End (1967)
 G-636 NA Joan C. Holly (as J. Holly Hunter) The Assassination Affair (1967)
 G-637 SF Philip K. Dick and Ray Nelson The Ganymede Takeover (1967)
 G-639 SF Edmond Hamilton The Weapon from Beyond: Starwolf Series#1 (1967)
 G-640 SF Thomas Burnett Swann The Weirwoods (1967)
 G-641 SF Jack Williamson Bright New Universe (1967)
 G-643 NA Jean Vicary Saverstall (1967)
 G-644 SF Jack Jardine (as Larry Maddock) The Emerald Elephant Gambit: Agent of T.E.R.R.A.#3
 G-645 NA Gene DeWeese and Robert Coulson (jointly as Thomas Stratton) The Invisibility Affair (1967)
 G-646 SF Andre Norton The X Factor (1967)
 G-647 SF Will F. Jenkins (as Murray Leinster) S.O.S. from Three Worlds (1967)
 G-649 SF John Brunner The World Swappers (1967)
 G-650 SF Neil R. Jones Space War: Professor Jameson Space Adventure#3
 G-651 NA Elizabeth Salter Once Upon a Tombstone (1967)
 G-652 NA Michael Bonner The Disturbing Death of Jenkin Delaney (1967)
 G-653 NA Arlene Hale Doctor's Daughter (1967)
 G-654 SF Andre Norton Catseye (1967)
 G-655 SF Andre Norton Witch World (1967)
 G-656 SF John Jakes When the Star Kings Die (1967)
 G-657 WE Nelson Nye Rider on the Roan (1967)
 G-658 NA Rona Shambrook (as Rona Randall) Leap in the Dark (1967)
 G-660 SF A. E. van Vogt The Universe Maker (1967)
 G-661 SF James Holbrook Vance (as Jack Vance) Big Planet (1967)
 G-662 NA Agnes Mary Robertson Dunlop (as Elisabeth Kyle) The Second Mally Lee (1967)
 G-663 NA Gene DeWeese and Robert Coulson (jointly as Thomas Stratton) The Mind-Twisters Affair (1967)
 G-664 SF John Brunner Born Under Mars (1967)
 G-665 WE L. L. Foreman Silver Flame
 G-666 NA Elizabeth Kelly (as Elizabeth Kellier) Wayneston Hospital (1967)
 G-667 SF David McDaniel The Arsenal Out of Time (1967)
 G-669 SF Leigh Brackett The Coming of the Terrans (1967)
 G-670 NA David McDaniel The Rainbow Affair (1967)
 G-671 SF John Brunner Catch a Falling Star (1967)
 G-672 NA Arlene Hale University Nurse (1967)
 G-673 SF Mark S. Geston Lords of the Starship
 G-675 SF James White The Secret Visitors (1967)
 G-676 NA John Sawyer and Nancy Buckingham Sawyer (as Nancy Buckingham) Storm in the Mountains (1967)
 G-677 SF Damon Knight Turning On: Thirteen Stories (1967)
 G-678 WE L. L. Foreman The Plundering Gun
 G-679 NA Willo Davis Roberts Nurse at Mystery Villa (1967)
 G-680 SF Kenneth Bulmer Cycle of Nemesis (1967)
 G-681 SF Neil R. Jones Twin Worlds: Professor Jameson Space Adventure#4 (1967)
 G-683 SF Leigh Brackett The Big Jump (1967)
 G-684 NA Barbara James Beauty That Must Die (1968)
 G-685 WE Herbert Purdum My Brother John
 G-686 NA Ray Dorien The Odds Against Nurse Pat (1968)
 G-688 SF John Holbrook Vance (as Jack Vance) City of the Chasch: Planet of Adventure#1 (1968)
 G-689 NA Ron Ellik and Fredric Langley (jointly as Fredric Davies) The Cross of Gold Affair (1968)
 G-690 SF Andre Norton The Beast Master (1968)
 G-691 SF Andre Norton Lord of Thunder
 G-692 SF Otis Adelbert Kline The Swordsman of Mars (1968)
 G-693 SF Otis Adelbert Kline The Outlaws of Mars (1968)
 G-694 SF Thomas Burnett Swann The Dolphin and the Deep (1968)
 G-695 WE Theodore V. Olsen Bitter Grass
 G-696 NA Arlene Hale Emergency Call (1968)
 G-697 SF Poul Anderson We Claim These Stars (1968)
 G-699 NA Cornell Woolrich The Bride Wore Black (1968)
 G-700 NA Elizabeth Salter Will to Survive (1968)
 G-701 SF Edmond Hamilton The Closed Worlds: Starwolf#2 (1968)
 G-702 NA William Johnston Miracle at San Tanco: The Flying Nun (1968)
 G-703 SF Andre Norton Victory on Janus (1968)
 G-704 WE Carse Boyd Navarro (1962)
 G-706 SF Samuel R. Delany The Jewels of Aptor (1968)
 G-707 NA T.E. Huff (as Edwina Marlowe) The Master of Phoenix Hall (1968)
 G-708 WE Clifton Adams A Partnership With Death (1968)
 G-709 SF John Brunner Bedlam Planet (1968)
 G-711 NA Rona Shambrook (as Rona Randall) Nurse Stacey Comes Aboard (1968)
 G-712 SF William A. P. White (as Anthony Boucher) and J. Francis Mccomas (eds.) The Best from Fantasy and Science Fiction, Third Series
 G-713 SF William A. P. White (as Anthony Boucher) (ed.) The Best from F & Sf Fourth Series (1968)
 G-714 SF William A. P. White (as Anthony Boucher) (ed.) The Best from F & Sf Fifth Series (1968)
 G-715 SF William A. P. White (as Anthony Boucher) (ed.) The Best from Fantasy and Science Fiction, Sixth Series (1968)
 G-716 SF Andre Norton Web of the Witch World
 G-717 SF Andre Norton Daybreak - 2250 A.D. (1968)
 G-718 SF Philip K. Dick Solar Lottery (1968)
 G-719 SF Neil R. Jones Doomday on Ajiat: Professor Jameson Space Adventure#5 (1968)
 G-720 WE Brian Garfield (as Brian Wynne) Brand of the Gun (1968)
 G-722 NA Gail Everett My Favorite Nurse (1968)
 G-723 SF Andre Norton Star Hunter & Voodoo Planet (1968)
 G-724 SF Philip José Farmer A Private Cosmos (1968)
 G-725 NA William Johnston The Littlest Rebels: The Flying Nun#2 (1968)
 G-726 WE Lee Hoffman The Valdez Horses (1968)
 G-728 SF Donald A. Wollheim (as David Grinnell) Across Time (1968)
 G-729 NA David McDaniel The Utopia Affair (1968)
 G-730 SF Alan E. Nourse Psi High and Others (1968)
 G-731 WE Nelson Nye A Lost Mine Named Shelton (1968)
 G-733 SF Edgar Rice Burroughs At the Earth's Core (1968)
 G-734 SF Edgar Rice Burroughs Pellucidar (1968)
 G-735 SF Edgar Rice Burroughs Tanar of Pellucidar (1968)
 G-736 SF Edgar Rice Burroughs Tarzan at the Earth's Core (1968)
 G-737 SF Edgar Rice Burroughs Back to the Stone Age (1968)
 G-738 SF Edgar Rice Burroughs Land of Terror (1968)
 G-739 SF Edgar Rice Burroughs Savage Pellucidar (1968)
 G-740 SF Fred Saberhagen The Broken Lands (1968)
 G-741 WE Wayne D. Overholser and Lewis B. Patten (jointly as Dean Owen) Red Is the Valley (1968)
 G-743 NA Sharon Heath Nurse on Castle Island (1968)
 G-744 NA Eula Atwood Morrison (as Andrea Delmonico) Chateau Chaumand (1968)
 G-745 SF Edgar Rice Burroughs The Moon Maid (1968)
 G-746 WE William Colt Macdonald Marked Deck at Topango Wells (1968)
 G-748 SF Edgar Rice Burroughs The Moon Men (1968)
 G-749 NA John Sawyer and Nancy Buckingham Sawyer (as Nancy Buckingham) Call of Glengarron (1968)
 G-750 NA Arlene Hale Dr. Barry's Nurse (1968)
 G-751 NA Mildred Davies The Dark Place (1968)
 G-752 NA Peter Leslie The Splintered Sunglasses Affair (1968)
 G-753 SF Alan Garner The Moon of Gomrath (1968)
 G-754 WE Jack L. Bickham The War on Charity Ross (1968)
 G-756 SF Alexei Panshin Star Well (1968)
 G-757 NA Helen Arvonen Remember With Tears (1968)
 G-758 SF Thomas Burnett Swann Moondust (1968)
 G-759 WE Giff Cheshire Wenatchee Bend (1968)
 G-761 SF John Brunner Catch a Falling Star (1968)
 G-762 SF Alexei Panshin The Thurb Revolution (1968)
 G-763 WE John Shelley and David Shelley Hell-For-Leather Jones (1968)
 G-765 NA Virginia Smiley Nurse Kate's Mercy Flight (1968)
 G-766 SF Edmond Hamilton World of the Starwolves: Starwolf#3 (1968)

H Series

 H-1 NA Theodore R. Kupferman The Family Legal Advisor
 H-3 NA Louis Paul Dara the Cypriot
 H-4 NA Olive Erkerson My Lord Essex
 H-5 NA John H. Culp Born of the Sun
 H-6 NA Florence A. Seward Gold for the Caesars
 H-7 NA John H. Culp The Restless Land
 H-8 NA Will Creed The Sword of Il Grande
 H-9 NA Theodora DuBois Captive of Rome (1966)
 H-10 NA Theodor Plievier Berlin (1966)
 H-11 NA Theodor Plievier Moscow (1966)
 H-12 NA Harold T. Wilkins Strange Mysteries of Time and Space (1966)
 H-13 NA Gardner Soule The Mystery Monsters (1966)
 H-14 NA Vincent Gaddis Invisible Horizons (1966)
 H-15 SF Donald A. Wollheim and Terry Carr (eds.) The World's Best Science Fiction: 1966
 H-16 NA Hans Holzer Ghosts I've Met (1965)
 H-17 NA Jacques Vallée Anatomy of a Phenomenon (1966)
 H-18 SF Jeff Sutton H-Bomb Over America (1966)
 H-19 SF Frederik Pohl (ed.) The If Reader of Science Fiction (1966)
 H-23 NA Georgette Heyer Arabella
 H-24 NA Charles Fort The Book of the Damned
 H-25 NA Jan Tempest House of the Pines
 H-26 SF Avram Davidson (ed.) The Best from Fantasy and Science Fiction, 13th Series (1967)
 H-28 NA Jacques Vallée Flying Saucers
 H-30 SF Clifford D. Simak City (1967)
 H-31 NA Dorothy Eden Sleep in the Woods
 H-32 NA Hal Ellson Games
 H-33 SF Andre Norton Moon of Three Rings (1967)
 H-35 NA Dorothy Eden The Daughters of Ardmore Hall (1967)
 H-37 NA Charlotte Hunt The Gilded Sarcophagus (1967)
 H-38 SF Fritz Leiber The Swords of Lankhmar (1968)
 H-39 SF Philip K. Dick Eye in the Sky (1968)
 H-41 SF Jules Verne Into the Niger Bend (1968)
 H-42 SF Clifford D. Simak Why Call Them Back from Heaven? (1968)
 H-43 SF Jules Verne The City in the Sahara (1968)
 H-44 NA Georgette Heyer The Quiet Gentleman
 H-46 NA Robert L. Scott Look of the Eagle
 H-47 NA Hans Holzer Lively Ghosts of Ireland
 H-49 SF Jules Verne The Begum's Fortune (1968)
 H-50 NA Janet Caird In a Glass, Darkly (1968)
 H-52 SF Jules Verne Yesterday and Tomorrow (1968)
 H-53 NA Leslie H. Whitten Progeny of the Adder (1968)
 H-54 SF R. A. Lafferty Past Master (1968)
 H-55 NA Willy Ley For Your Information: On Earth and in the Sky (1968)
 H-57 NA Cornell Woolrich Rendezvous in Black (1967)
 H-58 SF Gertrude Friedberg The Revolving Boy (1968)
 H-60 SF Jules Verne Carpathian Castle (1968)
 H-61 MY Elizabeth Salter Death in a Mist (1968)
 H-62 SF Wilson Tucker The Lincoln Hunters (1968)
 H-63 NA Miriam Allen Deford The Real Bonnie & Clyde (1968)
 H-64 NA Brinsley Le Poer Trench Flying Saucer Story
 H-66 NA Cornell Woolrich The Black Path of Fear (1968)
 H-67 SF Jules Verne The Village in the Treetops (1968)
 H-68 NA Raymond Bayless The Enigma of the Poltergeist (1968)
 H-69 NA Rona Shambrook (as Rona Randall) Knight's Keep (1968)
 H-71 NA Lois Dorothea Low (as Dorothy Mackie Low) Isle for a Stranger (1968)
 H-72 SF Joanna Russ Picnic on Paradise (1968)
 H-73 SF Fritz Leiber Swords Against Wizardy (1968)
 H-74 NA Charles Fort New Lands (1968)
 H-76 NA Georgette Heyer April Lady
 H-78 SF Jules Verne The Hunt for the Meteor (1968)
 H-79 SF Bob Shaw The Two-Timers (1968)
 H-80 MY Margaret Summerton (as Jan Roffman) With Murder in Mind (1968)
 H-81 NA John Macklin Passport to the Unknown (1968)
 H-83 NA Bernhardt J. Hurwood Vampires, Werewolves, and Ghouls (1968)
 H-84 SF Andre Norton Sorceress of the Witch World (1968)
 H-86 SF D. G. Compton Synthajoy (1968)
 H-87 NA Rebecca Liswood A Marriage Doctor Speaks Her Mind About Sex
 H-88 NA Charles Fort Wild Talents
 H-89 SF John Macklin Dimensions Beyond the Unknown
 H-90 SF Fritz Leiber Swords in the Mist (1968)
 H-92 SF A. E. van Vogt The Far-Out Worlds of A. E. van Vogt (1968)
 H-93 MY Delano Ames The Man in the Tricorn Hat
 H-94 NA John Macklin Dwellers in Darkness (1968)
 H-96 NA Shirley Jackson The Sundial
 H-97 MY Delano Ames The Man With Three Jaguars
 H-98 NA Charlotte Hunt The Cup of Thanatos (1958)
 H-99 NA Nostradamus; Robb Stewart (trans.) Prophecies on World Events
 H-100 NA Hans Holzer ESP and You
 H-101 NA Georgette Heyer Sprig Muslin
 H-102 SF Edward E. Smith Subspace Explorers (1968)
 H-104 NA Cornell Woolrich The Black Curtain (1968)
 H-105 SF James H. Schmitz The Demon Breed (1968)
 H-106 NA Janet Caird Perturbing Spirit
 H-107 NA Virginia Coffman The Dark Gondola
 H-108 NA John Macklin Challenge to Reality

K Series

 K-101 NA Charles Francis Potter The Faith Men Live By
 K-102 NA Richard E. Byrd Alone
 K-103 NA Prudencio de Pereda Fiesta
 K-104 NA W.A. Swanberg Sickles the Incredible
 K-105 NA Alfred Duggan Winter Quarters
 K-106 NA Allen Churchill The Improper Bohemians
 K-107 WE Hugh B. Cave The Cross on the Drum (1959)
 K-108 NA D. Robertson Three Days
 K-109 NA Dalton Trumbo Jonny Got His Gun (1959)
 K-110 NA Kirst The Seventh Day (1959)
 K-111 NA Robert Sproul The Cracked Reader
 K-112 NA Les Savage, Jr. The Royal City
 K-113 NA Eric Duthie Tall Short Stories
 K-114 NA O.A. Bushnell Peril in Paradise
 K-115 NA A.A. Hoehling They Sailed Into Oblivion
 K-116 NA Elliot West Man Running
 K-117 NA Frank Edward Stranger Than Science (1960)
 K-118 NA Alfred Duggan Children of the Wolf (1959)
 K-119 NA Ralph Ginzburg Erotica
 K-120 NA J. Haslip Lucrezia Borgia
 K-121 NA Robert C. Ruark Grenadine Etching - Her Life and Loves
 K-122 NA Kurt Singer (ed.) Spies Who Changed History
 K-123 NA Richard B. Erno The Hunt
 K-124 NA Peter Freuchen Eskimo
 K-125 NA Harold Mehling Scandalous Scamps
 K-126 NA Robert Dahl Breakdown
 K-127 NA George Stewart Fire
 K-128 NA Clellan S. Ford and Frank A. Beach Patterns of Sexual Behavior
 K-129 NA Alfred Duggan Conscience of the King
 K-132 NA Harnett Thomas Kane Spies for the Blue and Gray
 K-133 NA Don Berry Trask: The Coast of Oregon, 1848
 K-134 NA Peter Fleming Operation Sea Lion
 K-136 NA C. D. MacDougall Hoaxes
 K-137 NA George Bluestone The Private World of Cully Powers
 K-138 NA George R. Stewart Ordeal By Hunger
 K-139 NA Alfred Duggan Three's Company
 K-140 NA Harry R. Litchfield Your Child's Care
 K-141 NA Emil Ludwig Michelangelo and Rembrandt: Selections from Three Titans
 K-142 NA Brant House (ed.) Crimes That Shocked America
 K-143 NA Willa Gibbs The Twelfth Physician
 K-144 NA Frank Edwards Strangest of All (1962)
 K-145 NA Harry F. Tashman The Marriage Bed
 K-146 NA Rowena Farr Seal Morning
 K-147 NA Carl J. Spinatelli Baton Sinister (1959)
 K-148 NA Herbert Asbury The Chicago Underworld
 K-149 NA Talbot Mundy Queen Cleopatra (1962)
 K-150 NA Patricia Robins Lady Chatterley's Daughter (1961)
 K-151 NA Pierce G. Fredericks The Great Adventure
 K-152 NA Brant House (ed.) Great Trials of Famous Lawyers (1962)
 K-153 NA Rebecca Liswood A Marriage Doctor Speaks Her Mind About Sex
 K-154 SF George R. Stewart Earth Abides (1962)
 K-155 NA Thomas R. Henry The Strangest Things in the World
 K-156 NA Charles Fort The Book of the Damned
 K-157 NA E.H.G. Lutz Miracles of Modern Surgery
 K-158 NA Phyllis A. Whitney Thunder Heights
 K-159 NA Theodora DuBois Captive of Rome
 K-160 NA Guy Endore The Werewolf of Paris
 K-161 NA Frederick L. Collins The FBI in Peace and War
 K-162 NA Richard O'Connor Gould's Millions
 K-163 NA Rupert Furneaux Worlds Strangest Mysteries
 K-164 NA Phyllis A. Whitney The Trembling Hills
 K-166 NA Shirley Jackson The Sundial
 K-167 NA Karen Blixen (as Pierre Andrezel) The Angelic Avengers
 K-168 NA R. Dewitt Miller Stranger Than Life
 K-169 NA Scott Sullivan The Shortest Gladdest Years
 K-170 NA John J. Pugh High Carnival
 K-171 NA Dorothy Eden Lady of Mallow
 K-172 NA Peter Bourne The Golden Pagans
 K-173 NA Dorothea Malm To the Castle
 K-174 NA Georgette Heyer The Grand Sophy
 K-175 NA Virginia Coffman Moura (1963)
 K-176 NA Brant House Strange Powers of Unusual People
 K-177 NA Anya Seton My Theodosia
 K-178 NA Phyllis A. Whitney The Quicksilver Pool
 K-179 NA Georgette Heyer Venetia
 K-180 NA Margaret Lynn To See a Stranger
 K-181 NA Margaret Summerton The Sea House
 K-182 NA Doris Webster and Mary A. Hopkins Instant Self-Analysis
 K-183 NA Phyllis Bentley The House of Moreys
 K-184 NA Dorothy Eden Whistle for the Crows
 K-185 NA Shirley Jackson Hangsaman
 K-187 NA Henry Bellamann Victoria Grandolet
 K-188 NA Richard E. Byrd Alone
 K-189 NA Dorothy Cameron Disney The Hangman's Tree
 K-190 NA Jim Egleson and Janet Frank Egleson Parents Without Partners
 K-191 NA Anne Buxton (as Anne Maybury) The Brides of Bellenmore (1963)
 K-192 NA Sheila Bishop The House With Two Faces
 K-193 NA Franklin S. Klaf and Bernhardt J. Hurwood A Psychiatrist Looks at Erotica
 K-194 NA Margaret Summerton Nightingale at Noon
 K-195 NA Michael Avallone (as Edwina Noone) Dark Cypress
 K-196 NA Joseph Sidney Karnake and Victor Boesen Navy Diver
 K-197 NA Doris Miles Disney Who Rides a Tiger
 K-198 NA Josephine Bell Stranger on a Cliff
 K-199 NA Barbara O'Brien Operators and Things (1958)
 K-200 NA J.L. Whitney The Whisper of Shadows
 K-201 NA Georgette Heyer April Lady (1964)
 K-202 NA William Burroughs Junkie (1964)
 K-203 NA Jan Hillard Morgan's Castle
 K-204 NA Robert Payne Charlie Chapin: The Great God Pan (1964)
 K-205 NA Ruth Willock The Night of the Visitor
 K-206 NA Frank Edwards Strange World
 K-207 NA Lady Eleanor Smith A Dark and Splendid Passion
 K-208 NA Nicole Maxwell The Jungle Search for Nature's Cures
 K-209 NA Aileen Seilaz The Veil of Silence (1965)
 K-210 NA Hans Holzer Ghost Hunter
 K-211 NA Anne Buxton (as Anne Maybury) The Pavilion at Monkshood (1965)
 K-212 NA Sheila Bishop The Durable Fire
 K-213 NA Michael Avallone (as Edwina Noone) Dark Cypress (1965)
 K-215 NA Rohan O'Grady The Master of Montrolfe Hall
 K-216 NA Jan Roffman The Reflection of Evil
 K-217 NA Charles Fort Lo!
 K-218 NA Ross Santee Cowboy
 K-219 NA Joan Aiken The Silence of Herondale
 K-220 NA Susan Howatch The Dark Shore
 K-221 NA Virginia Coffman The Beckoning
 K-222 NA John Macklin Strange Destinies
 K-223 NA Michael Avallone (as Edwina Noone) Corridor of Whispers
 K-224 NA Brant House Strange Powers of Unusual People
 K-225 NA Michael Avallone The Summer of Evil
 K-226 NA Georgette Heyer Sylvester
 K-227 NA Anne Buxton (as Anne Maybury) Green Fire
 K-228 NA Robb Stewart Strange Prophecies That Came True
 K-228 NA Joan Winslow Griffin Towers
 K-229 NA R. DeWitt Miller Impossible: Yet It Happened!
 K-230 NA Dorothy Eden The Pretty Ones
 K-231 NA Lane Peters Promise Him Anything
 K-232 NA Anne Buxton (as Anne Maybury) The House of Fand
 K-233 NA Patricia Robins Lady Chatterley's Daughter
 K-234 NA Virginia Coffman The Devil Vicar
 K-235 NA Georgette Heyer Sprig Muslin
 K-236 NA Dorothy Eden Bridge of Fear
 K-237 NA Robert Tralins Strange Events Beyond Human Understanding
 K-238 NA Anne Buxton (as Anne Maybury) Someone Waiting
 K-239 NA Dorothy Eden The Sleeping Bride
 K-240 NA Susan Howatch The Waiting Sands
 K-241 NA Brad Steiger Strange Guests
 K-242 NA Ruth Comfort Mitchell The Legend of Susan Dane
 K-243 NA Dorothy Eden The Deadly Travellers
 K-244 NA Kurt Singer (ed.) The Gothic Reader
 K-245 NA Marie Garratt Dangerous Enchantment
 K-246 NA Joan Grant Castle Cloud
 K-247 WE Frances Ames That Callahan Spunk! (1965)
 K-248 NA Anne Buxton (as Anne Maybury) Whisper in the Dark
 K-249 NA Dorothy Eden The Brooding Lake
 K-250 NA Dr. Webb B. Garrison Strange Bonds Between Animals and Men
 K-251 NA Anne Buxton (as Anne Maybury) Shadow of a Stranger
 K-252 NA Phyllis A. Whitney The Trembling Hills
 K-254 NA Rupert Furneaux The World's Strangest Mysteries
 K-255 NA R. DeWitt Miller Impossible: Yet It Happened!
 K-257 NA Anne Buxton (as Anne Maybury) I Am Gabriella!
 K-258 NA Barbara Blackburn City of Forever
 K-259 NA Michael Harvey Strange Happenings
 K-260 NA Joan Rich and Leslie Rich Dating and Mating By Computer (1966)
 K-261 NA Dorothy Eden Night of the Letter (1967)
 K-262 NA Rona Shambrook (as Rona Randall) Walk Into My Parlor (1966)
 K-263 NA Anne Buxton (as Anne Maybury) The Night My Enemy (1967)
 K-264 NA Jane Blackmore The Dark Between the Stars (1967)
 K-265 NA Georgette Heyer The Reluctant Widow (1967)
 K-266 NA Thomas R. Henry The Strangest Things in the World (1967)
 K-267 NA Dorothy Eden Listen to Danger (1967)
 K-268 NA Brad Steiger Treasure Hunting
 K-269 NA Rona Shambrook (as Rona Randall) Seven Days from Midnight
 K-271 NA Anne Buxton (as Anne Maybury) Falcon's Shadow
 K-272 NA Hans Holzer Yankee Ghosts (1966)
 K-273 NA Rona Shambrook (as Rona Randall) The Willow Herb (1967)
 K-275 NA Dorothy Eden Crow Hollow (1967)
 K-276 NA Bernhardt J. Hurwood Strange Talents (1967)
 K-278 NA Helen Arvonen Circle of Death
 K-279 NA Anonymous The Strange and Uncanny
 K-280 NA Susan Howatch Call in the Night (1967)
 K-281 NA Margaret Wetherby Williams (as Margaret Erskine) No. 9 Belmont Square (1967)
 K-282 NA Anne Buxton (as Anne Maybury) The Winds of Night
 K-283 NA Nancy Buckingham Cloud Over Malverton (1967)
 K-284 NA Monica Dickens The Room Upstairs
 K-285 NA Rona Shambrook (as Rona Randall) Hotel Deluxe
 K-286 NA Nancy Buckingham The Hour Before Moonrise
 K-287 NA Margaret Wetherby Williams (as Margaret Erskine) Old Mrs. Ommanney is Dead
 K-288 NA Robb Stewart Strange Prophecies That Came True (1967)
 K-289 NA Jane Blackmore Night of the Stranger (1967)
 K-290 NA Jan Roffman Ashes in an Urn (1966)
 K-291 NA Brad Steiger We Have Lived Before (1967)
 K-292 NA John Macklin The Enigma of the Unknown (1967)
 K-293 NA Elizabeth Ford Dangerous Holiday (1967)
 K-294 NA Joan Aiken Beware of the Bouquet (1967)
 K-295 NA Margaret Wetherby Williams (as Margaret Erskine) The Woman at Belguardo (1967)
 K-296 NA Warren Smith Strange Powers of the Mind
 K-297 NA Nancy Buckingham The Dark Summer (1968)
 K-298 NA Rona Shambrook (as Rona Randall) The Silver Cord
 K-299 NA Rae Folly Fear of a Stranger
 K-300 NA Michael Hervey They Walk By Night
 K-301 NA Dorothy Eden The Laughing Ghost
 K-303 NA Jane Blackmore Beware the Night (1967)
 K-304 NA Margaret Wetherby Williams (as Margaret Erskine) The Family at Tannerton (1967)
 K-305 NA John Macklin Strange Encounters (1968)
 K-306 NA Susan Howatch The Shrouded Walls (1968)
 K-307 NA Brad Steiger The Occult World of John Pendragon (1968)

A Series

 A-1 NA Brigitte von Tessin The Shame and the Glory (1966)
 A-3 SF Bernard Wolfe Limbo (1966)
 A-4 SF J. R. R. Tolkien The Fellowship of the Ring (1965)
 A-5 SF J. R. R. Tolkien The Two Towers (1965)
 A-6 SF J. R. R. Tolkien The Return of the King (1965)
 A-7 NA The Editors of Short Story International The World's Best Contemporary Short Stories (1966)
 A-8 SF John Myers Myers Silverlock (1966)
 A-9 NA Todhunter Ballard Gold in California! (1966)
 A-10 SF Terry Carr and Donald A. Wollheim (eds.) The World's Best SF: 1967 (1967)
 A-11 NA Harold T. Wilkins Flying Saucers on the Attack (1967)
 A-12 SF Terry Carr (ed.) New Worlds of Fantasy (1967)
 A-13 SF James H. Schmitz The Witches of Karres (1968)
 A-15 SF Terry Carr and Donald A. Wollheim (eds.) World's Best SF: 1968 (1968)
 A-16 SF Alexei Panshin Rite of Passage (1968)
 A-17 SF Avram Davidson (ed.) The Best from Fantasy & Science Fiction, 14th Series (1968)
 A-18 NA Frederick E. Smith A Killing for the Hawks
 A-19 SF Piers Anthony and Robert E. Margroff The Ring (1968)
 A-20 NA Dorothy Malone Cookbook for Beginners (1968)
 A-21 NA Corinne Griffith Eggs I Have Known (1968)
 A-22 NA Jean Mattimore and Clark Mattimore Cooking By the Clock (1968)
 A-23 NA Alberto Moravia The Wayward Wife (1968)
 A-24 NA William A. Bishop Winged Warfare (1967)
 A-25 SF Edgar Rice Burroughs The Outlaw of Torn (1968)
 A-26 NA Peter J. Steincrohn How to Get a Good Night's Sleep (1968)
 A-27 NA Jim Harmon The Great Radio Heroes (1968)
 A-28 NA René Fonck Ace of Aces (1968)
 A-29 SF James Blish and Norman L. Knight A Torrent of Faces (1968)
 A-30 NF Ainslie Meares, M.D. Relief Without Drugs
 A-130 NA Robert B. Douglas (trans.) The Hundred Stories (1968)

N Series
Ace Books published its N series from 1965 to 1966, priced at 95 cents.

 N-1 NA UPI editors Retrospect 1964: Summaries and Captions from Special U.P.I Dispatches (1965)
 N-2 NA UPI editors Retrospect 1965: U.P.I. Pictorial History of 1964 (1966)
 N-3 SF Frank Herbert Dune (1965)
 N-4 NA Isaac Asimov Is Anyone There? (1966)

Numbered Series
 00075 SF John Jakes When the Star Kings Die
 00078 SF R.A. Salvatore The Dragons Dagger
 00078 SF Peter George (as Peter Bryant) Red Alert (1958)
 00092 SF John Macklin Dwellers in Darkness
 00093 SF Fred Saberhagen The Black Mountains
 00094 SF Leigh Brackett The Big Jump
 00104 SF Mack Reynolds Section G: United Planets
 00106 SF John Macklin Passport to the Unknown
 00107 SF James White The Secret Visitors
 00108 SF Roger Zelazny Four for Tomorrow
 00109 SF Mark S. Geston Lords of the Starship
 00110 SF Fritz Leiber Swords in the Mist
 00111 SF John W. Campbell, Jr. Invaders from the Infinite
 00119 SF William Shatner Teksecret
 00125 SF Mary Staton From the Legend of Biel
 00142 SF Steve Perry The Forever Drug (1995)
 00153 SF Fritz Leiber Swords Against Wizardry
 00241 NA Jack Luzzatto Ace Crossword Puzzle Book#2 (1969)
 00265 SF Mack Reynolds Ability Quotient
 00275 SF Donald A. Wollheim (ed.) Ace Science Fiction Reader (1971)
 00289 SF William Shatner Tekpower
 00348 SF Greg Bear Blood Music (1996)
 00390 SF William Shatner Tekmoney
 00950 SF Ron Goulart After Things Fell Apart (1970)
 00958 SF Mack Reynolds After Utopia (1977)
 01000 SF John Brunner Age of Miracles
 01040 SF Larry Maddock Agent of T.E.R.R.A.#1: The Flying Saucer Gambit
 01041 SF Larry Maddock Agent of T.E.R.R.A.#2: The Golden Goddess Gambit
 01042 SF Larry Maddock Agent of T.E.R.R.A.#3: The Emerald Elephant Gambit
 01043 SF Larry Maddock Agent of T.E.R.R.A.#4: The Time Trap Gambit
 01066 SF Poul Anderson Agent of the Terran Empire
 01501 SF Robert A. Heinlein The Worlds of Robert A. Heinlein
 01570 SF Fletcher Pratt Alien Planet
 01625 NA Dick Lupoff and Don Thompson (ed.) All in Color for a Dime (1970)
 01750 SF Robert E. Howard Almuric
 01770 SF Leigh Brackett Alpha Centauri Or Die (1976)
 02236 SF Stanley Schmidt (ed.) Analog Yearbook Ii
 02268 SF Joanna Russ And Chaos Died (1970)
 02274 SF Donald R. Bensen And Having Writ... (1978)
 02276 MY Philip Loraine The Angel of Death (1961)
 02295 SF Keith Roberts Anita (1970)
 02320 SF Alexei Panshin Masque World
 02380 SF Tim Powers The Anubis Gates
 02900 NA John Jakes (as Jay Scotland) Arena
 02935 SF Philip Francis Nowlan Armageddon 2419 A.D.
 02936 SF Philip Francis Nowlan Armageddon 2419 A.D.
 02938 SF Philip Francis Nowlan Armageddon 2419 A.D.
 02940 NA Rona Randall The Arrogant Duke (1972)
 03297 SF Jack Vance The Asutra (Dundane Trilogy book 3 of 3) (1973)
 03300 SF John Brunner The Atlantic Abomination (1960)
 03322 SF Edgar Rice Burroughs At the Earth's Core
 03325 SF Edgar Rice Burroughs At the Earth's Core
 03326 SF Edgar Rice Burroughs At the Earth's Core (1978)
 03328 SF Edgar Rice Burroughs At the Earth's Core (1985)
 04040 SF Joanna Russ Picnic on Paradise
 04591 SF Samuel R. Delany Babel-17 (1966)
 04592 SF Samuel R. Delany Babel-17 (1974)
 04636 SF Edgar Rice Burroughs Back to the Stone Age
 04722 SF Samuel R. Delany The Ballad of Beta 2
 04745 WE Edgar Rice Burroughs The Bandit of Hell's Bend
 04745 NA Edgar Rice Burroughs The Bandit of Hell's Bend
 04755 NA E. Kelton Barbed Wire
 04760 SF Tom Purdom The Barons of Behavior (1972)
 04860 SF A. E. van Vogt The Battle of Forever (1971)
 05330 SF Jack London Before Adam
 05404 SF Fred Saberhagen Berserker
 05404 SF Fred Saberhagen Berserker (1979)
 05407 SF Fred Saberhagen Berserker Man (1979)
 05407 SF Fred Saberhagen Berserker Man
 05408 SF Fred Saberhagen Berserker's Planet (1980)
 05424 SF Fred Saberhagen Berserker Man
 05454 SF Edward L. Ferman (ed.) The Best from Fantasy and Science Fiction, 15th Series (1966)
 05455 SF Edward L. Ferman (ed.) The Best from Fantasy and Science Fiction, 16th Series
 05456 SF Edward L. Ferman (ed.) The Best from Fantasy and Science Fiction, 17th Series
 05457 SF Edward L. Ferman (ed.) The Best from Fantasy and Science Fiction, 18th Series
 05458 SF Edward L. Ferman (ed.) The Best from Fantasy and Science Fiction, 19th Series (1973)
 05460 SF Edward L. Ferman (ed.) The Best from Fantasy and Science Fiction: A Special 25th Anniversary Anthology
 05461 SF Edward L. Ferman (ed.) The Best from Fantasy and Science Fiction, 22nd Series (1978)
 05475 SF Lester Del Rey (ed.) Best Science Fiction Stories of the Year (1st Annual Collection) (1972)
 05476 SF Lester Del Rey (ed.) Best Science Fiction Stories of the Year (2nd Annual Collection)
 05477 SF Lester Del Rey (ed.) Best Science Fiction Stories of the Year (3rd Annual Collection) (1974)
 05478 SF Lester Del Rey (ed.) Best Science Fiction Stories of the Year (4th Annual Collection) (1977)
 05479 SF Lester Del Rey (ed.) Best Science Fiction Stories of the Year (5th Annual Collection) (1977)
 05481 SF Mack Reynolds The Best Ye Breed
 05496 SF Fred Saberhagen Berserker Man
 05500 SF Robert A. Heinlein Between Planets
 05586 SF John Varley The Golden Globe
 05655 SF Edgar Rice Burroughs Beyond the Farthest Star (1973)
 05656 SF Edgar Rice Burroughs Beyond the Farthest Star (1979)
 05785 SF Shepherd Mead The Big Ball of Wax
 06061 SF Leigh Brackett The Big Jump (1976)
 06171 SF Jack Vance Big Planet (1978)
 06177 SF Keith Laumer The Big Show
 06505 NA Cornell Woolrich The Black Angel (1965)
 06530 SF Michael Moorcock The Black Corridor
 06615 SF Fred Saberhagen The Black Mountains
 06701 SF John W. Campbell The Black Star Passes
 06715 NA Charles Lefebure The Blood Cults (1969)
 06854 SF Marion Zimmer Bradley The Bloody Sun
 07012 SF L. Sprague de Camp and Catherine Crook De Camp The Bones of Zora
 07080 NA Joyce Keener Border-Line (1979)
 07162 SF John Brunner Born Under Mars
 07180 SF Marion Zimmer Bradley The Brass Dragon
 07200 SF Jack Vance The Brave Free Men: Book II of the Durdane Trilogy (1972)
 07690 SF Murray Leinster The Brain-Stealers
 07840 SF Ray Cummings A Brand New World
 07895 SF Andre Norton Breed to Come (1973)
 07921 MY Cornell Woolrich Bride Wore Black (1940)
 08145 SF John Rankine The Bromius Phenomenon
 08215 SF Fred Saberhagen Brother Assassin
 09022 SF Robert O'Riodan Cadre One
 09037 SF Spider Robinson Callahan's Crosstime Saloon (1977)
 09069 SF Spider Robinson Callahan's Crosstime Saloon
 09072 SF Spider Robinson Callahan's Lady (1989)
 09102 NA Nancy Buckingham Call of Glengarron
 09128 NA Kenneth Von Gunden K-9 Corps
 09200 SF Edgar Rice Burroughs Carson of Venus
 09203 SF Edgar Rice Burroughs Carson of Venus
 09205 SF Edgar Rice Burroughs Carson of Venus (1982)
 09265 SF Andre Norton Catseye
 09281 SF Edgar Rice Burroughs The Cave Girl
 09284 SF Edgar Rice Burroughs The Cave Girl
 10150 SF Walt Richmond Challenge the Hellmaker
 10258 SF Margaret St. Clair Change the Sky and Other Stories (1974)
 10307 SF Ursula K. Le Guin City of Illusions (1967)
 10410 SF A. E. van Vogt Children of Tomorrow
 10411 SF A. E. van Vogt Children of Tomorrow
 10471 NA Sam Bowie Chisum (1970)
 10600 SF Robert A. Heinlein Citizen of the Galaxy
 10621 SF Clifford D. Simak City
 10701 SF Ursula K. Le Guin City of Illusions (1967)
 10702 SF Ursula K. Le Guin City of Illusion
 11036 SF Philip K. Dick Clans of the Alphane Moon (1972)
 11222 NA Nancy Buckingham Cloud Over Malverton
 11457 SF Robert E. Howard, L. Sprague de Camp, and Lin Carter Conan the Freebooter
 11467 SF Robert E. Howard, Björn Nyberg, and L. Sprague de Camp Conan the Avenger (Conan #10)
 11546 SF Leigh Brackett The Coming of the Terrans (1976)
 11603 SF Robert E. Howard (edited by L. Sprague de Camp) Conan the Conqueror (Conan #9)
 11622 SF Anthony Boucher The Complete Werewolf & Other Stories of Fantasy & Science Fiction (1969)
 11630 SF Robert E. Howard, L. Sprague de Camp, and Lin Carter Conan
 11633 SF Robert E. Howard, L. Sprague de Camp, and Lin Carter Conan the Wanderer
 11659 SF Andrew J. Offutt Conan the Mercenary (1981)
 11669 SF L. Sprague de Camp (ed.) The Spell of Conan (1980)
 11670 SF L. Sprague de Camp (ed.) The Blade of Conan (1979)
 11671 SF Robert E. Howard, L. Sprague de Camp, and Lin Carter Conan (1967)
 11672 SF Robert E. Howard, L. Sprague de Camp, and Lin Carter Conan of Cimmeria
 11673 SF Robert Howard, L. Sprague de Camp, and Lin Carter Conan the Freebooter
 11674 SF Robert E. Howard, L. Sprague de Camp, and Lin Carter Conan the Wanderer
 11675 SF Robert E. Howard, L. Sprague de Camp, Conan the Adventurer
 11676 SF L. Sprague de Camp and Lin Carter Conan the Buccaneer
 11677 SF Robert E. Howard and L. Sprague de Camp Conan the Warrior
 11678 SF Robert E. Howard and L. Sprague de Camp Conan the Usurper
 11679 SF Robert E. Howard (ed. L. Sprague de Camp) Conan the Conqueror
 11680 SF Robert E. Howard, Björn Nyberg, and L. Sprague de Camp Conan the Avenger
 11681 SF L. Sprague de Camp and Lin Carter Conan of the Isles
 11682 SF L. Sprague de Camp and Lin Carter Conan of Aquilonia
 11684 SF Andrew J. Offutt Conan and the Sorcerer (1979)
 11705 SF Robert Silverberg Conquerors from the Darkness
 11759 SF H. Beam Piper The Cosmic Computer
 11863 SF Robert E. Howard and L. Sprague de Camp Conan the Freebooter
 12126 SF Philip K. Dick The Crack in Space (1966)
 12311 SF Andre Norton The Crossroads of Time
 12313 SF Andre Norton The Crossroads of Time (1978)
 13245 SF Alan Dean Foster Cyber Way
 13600 SF Margaret St. Clair The Dancers of Noyo (1973)
 13612 SF Robert E. Howard and L. Sprague de Camp Conan the Freebooter
 13681 NA Marie Garratt Dangerous Enchantment
 13795 SF Andre Norton Dark Piper
 13798 SF A. E. van Vogt The Darkness on Diamondia
 13898 SF Robert Silverberg and Randall Garrett (jointly as Robert Randall) The Dawning Light (1982)
 13902 SF Barry N. Malzberg The Day of the Burning
 13921 SF Thomas Burnett Swann Day of the Minotaur
 13960 SF Mack Reynolds Day After Tomorrow
 13972 SF Brian M. Stableford Days of Wrath
 13994 SF Andre Norton Daybreak - 2250 A. D.
 14000 SF Brian M. Stableford The Days of Glory
 14153 MY Cornell Woolrich (as William Irish) Deadline at Dawn
 14165 MY Jack Vance (as John Holbrook Vance) The Deadly Isles
 14194 WE Nelson Nye Death Valley Slim
 14198 WE John Bickham Decker's Campaign
 14215 SF Greg Benford Deeper Than the Darkness
 14235 SF Andre Norton The Defiant Agents (1978)
 14236 SF Andre Norton The Defiant Agents
 14240 WE Wayne C. Lee Die-Hard
 14244 SF James Schmitz The Demon Breed (1979)
 14247 NA Edgar Rice Burroughs The Deputy Sheriff of Comanche County (1940)
 14249 SF Andre Norton The Defiant Agents
 14250 SF Mack Reynolds Depression Or Bust! and Dawnman's Planet
 14251 SF Poul Anderson, Mildred Downey Broxon, Michael Whelan, and Alicia Austin The Demon of Scattery (1979)
 14256 NA Walter Scott Demonology & Witchcraft
 14258 NA David Rome The Depraved (1968)
 14277 SF James Baen (ed.) Destinies Vol. 1, No. 3 (April - June, 1979)
 14879 SF Timothy Powers Dinner at the Deviants Palace
 14903 SF Frank Herbert Direct Descent
 15238 SF George Warren Dominant Species
 15670 SF Philip K. Dick Dr. Bloodmoney, Or How We Got Along After the Bomb (1976)
 15697 SF Philip K. Dick The Unteleported Man (1972)
 16600 SF Fred Saberhagen The Dracula Tape (1972)
 16647 SF Andre Norton Dragon Magic
 16648 SF Jack Vance The Dragon Masters
 16651 SF Jack Vance The Dragon-Masters (1981)
 16668 SF John Brunner The Dramaturges of Yan
 16669 SF Andre Norton Dread Companion (1970)
 16670 SF Andre Norton Dread Companion (1970)
 16701 SF Roger Zelazny The Dream Master
 16728 SF Larry Niven and Steven Barnes Dream Park (1983)
 17239 SF Ben Bova The Dueling Machine
 17625 SF Frank Herbert Dune
 17810 NA Jan Hoffman A Dying in the Night (1975)
 18630 SF Gordon Eklund The Eclipse Of Dawn (1970)
 18770 SF Edgar Rice Burroughs Master of Adventure (1968)
 19640 NA Eliot Asinof Eight Men Out (1963)
 19681 SF Samuel R. Delany The Einstein Intersection
 19710 SF Bob Shaw A Wreath of Stars
 20275 SF Alan Garner Elidor
 20563 SF Fred Saberhagen Empire of the East
 20565 SF Barrington J. Bayley Empire of Two Worlds
 20571 SF Samuel R. Delany The Ballad of Beta-2 and Empire Star
 20664 SF Jerry Pournelle Endless Frontier, Volume I
 20670 SF Judith Merril (ed.) England Swings Sf: Stories of Speculative Fiction
 20724 SF Poul Anderson Ensign Flandry
 20730 SF Keith Laumer Envoy to New Worlds
 21562 SF Edgar Rice Burroughs Escape on Venus
 21567 SF Edgar Rice Burroughs Escape on Venus
 21590 SF James White The Escape Orbit (1983)
 21599 SF Christopher Stasheff Escape Velocity
 21803 SF Edgar Rice Burroughs The Eternal Savage
 21804 SF Edgar Rice Burroughs The Eternal Savage
 21806 SF Edgar Rice Burroughs The Eternal Savage
 21885 SF Jerry Pournelle Exiles to Glory (1977)
 22215 SF Jerry Pournelle Exiles to Glory
 22216 SF Jerry Pournelle Exiles to Glory
 22327 NA Hans Holzer ESP and You
 22365 SF Andre Norton Exiles of the Stars
 22375 SF Andre Norton Eye of the Monster
 22386 SF Philip K. Dick Eye in the Sky (1975)
 22387 SF Philip K. Dick Eye in the Sky (1980)
 22500 SF Jack Vance The Faceless Man: Book One of the Durdane Trilogy (1978)
 22555 SF Jack Vance The Faceless Man (Dundane Trilogy book 1 of 3)
 22577 SF Marion Zimmer Bradley Falcons of Narabedla (1979)
 22680 NA Hershatter Fallout for a Spy
 22690 SF Barry N. Malzberg The Falling Astronauts
 22725 WE Nelson Nye Hellbound for Ballarat (1970)
 22742 NA Margaret Erskine The Family at Tammerton
 22811 SF A. E. van Vogt The Far-Out Worlds of Van Vogt (1968)
 22812 SF A. E. van Vogt The Worlds of A. E. van Vogt
 22819 SF Edmund Cooper A Far Sunset
 22830 SF D. G. Compton Farewell, Earth's Bliss
 23189 SF H. Beam Piper Federation (1982)
 23419 SF H. Beam Piper (ed. Michael Kurland) First Cycle (1982)
 23929 SF Dennis Schmidt Twilight of the Gods: The First Name
 23998 SF Shariann Lewitt First and Final Rites
 24035 SF Mack Reynolds Five Way Secret Agent and Mercenary from Tomorrow
 24302 NA W. Johnston The Underground Picnic: The Flying Nun#5 (1970)
 24415 NA John Michell The Flying Saucer Vision (1967)
 24590 SF R. A. Lafferty Fourth Mansions (1969)
 24800 SF Jules Verne For the Flag (1961)
 24806 SF David C. Smith and Richard Tierney For the Witch of the Mists (1981)
 24892 SF H. Beam Piper Four-Day Planet and Lone Star Planet
 24903 SF Roger Zelazny Four for Tomorrow
 24975 NA Jack Vance (as John Holbrook Vance) The Fox Valley Murders (1968)
 25165 NA Michael Hervey Fraternity of the Weird (1969)
 25300 NA Georgette Heyer Friday's Child (1946)
 25306 SF Arsen Darnay A Hostage for Hinterland (1976)
 25460 SF Mary Staton From the Legend of Biel
 25461 SF Mary Staton From the Legend of Biel
 25950 SF Suzette Haden Elgin Furthest (1971)
 25980 SF A. E. van Vogt Future Glitter (1973)
 26176 SF H. Beam Piper Fuzzies and Other People
 26181 SF William Tuning Fuzzy Bones
 26192 SF H. Beam Piper Fuzzy Sapiens
 26194 SF H. Beam Piper The Fuzzy Papers
 26196 SF H. Beam Piper Fuzzy Sapiens
 27226 SF Andre Norton Galactic Derelict
 27228 SF Andre Norton Galactic Derelict
 27229 SF Andre Norton Galactic Derelict (1978)
 27232 SF Jack Vance Galactic Effectuator (1981)
 27240 SF Mack Reynolds Galactic Medal of Honor
 27310 SF Philip K. Dick The Game-Players of Titan (1972)
 27346 SF Philip K. Dick and Ray Nelson The Ganymede Takeover (1977)
 27389 SF Philip José Farmer The Gates of Creation (1981)
 27419 SF Edmund Cooper A Far Sunset (1977)
 27501 SF Samuel R. Delany The Fall of the Towers
 27910 SF Howard Fast The General Zapped an Angel
 28702 SF James P. Blaylock The Stone Giant (1989)
 28911 WE Edgar Rice Burroughs The Girl from Hollywood
 28914 NA Michael Avallone The Girls in Television (1974)
 29350 NA Harlan Ellison The Glass Teat (1970)
 29400 SF L. Sprague de Camp The Glory That Was (1979)
 29525 SF Robert E. Howard The Gods of Bal-Sagoth
 29741 WE Todhunter Ballard Gold in California (1965)
 29743 NA Todhunter Ballard Gold in California (1965)
 29786 NA Peter Bourne The Golden Pagans
 30261 SF Frank Herbert The Green Brain
 30262 SF Frank Herbert The Green Brain
 30263 SF Frank Herbert The Green Brain
 30274 SF Lucius Shepard Green Eyes (1984)
 30295 SF Charles de Lint Greenmantle (1988)
 30301 SF Fritz Leiber The Green Millennium
 30590 SF Louis Trimble and Jacquelyn Trimble Guardians of the Gate
 30600 SF Edwin L. Arnold Gulliver of Mars (1905)
 30710 WE Giles A. Lutz Gun Rich
 31557 SF Andre Norton The X Factor
 31590 SF Leigh Brackett The Halfling and Other Stories (1973)
 31725 NA Shirley Jackson Hangsaman
 31781 NA Leal Hayes Harlequin House
 31800 SF Robert A. Heinlein Have Space Suit - Will Travel
 31801 SF Robert A. Heinlein Have Space Suit - Will Travel
 31930 NA Jane Blackmore Hawkridge (1976)
 31940 NA John Swenson Headliners: Kiss: The Greatest Rock Show on Earth! (1978)
 31941 NA Charley Walters Headliners: Fleetwood Mac (1979)
 31986 SF David Drake Hammer's Slammers
 32335 NA Anonymous The Young Rebels: The Hedgerow Incident (1970)
 32575 WE Charles O. Locke The Hell Bent Kid
 32800 SF Frank Herbert Heretics of Dune (1987)
 33700 SF Andre Norton High Sorcery
 33701 SF Andre Norton High Sorcery (1970)
 33704 SF Andre Norton High Sorcery
 34245 SF Fred Saberhagen The Holmes-Dracula File (1978)
 34250 NA N. Fredrik Hollywood and the Academy Awards (1970)
 34260 NA Mair Unsworth Home to My Love (1973)
 34345 SF Orson Scott Card Hot Sleep: The Worthing Chronicle
 34361 NA Nancy Buckingham The Hour Before Moonrise
 34440 NA Barbara Lane Housewife Hookers (1973)
 34441 NA Barbara Lane Housewife Hookers, Part II (1974)
 34458 SF Glenn Lord (ed.) The Howard Collector
 34900 SF Bruce Mcallister Humanity Prime
 35241 SF Andre Norton Huon of the Horn
 35804 SF Edgar Rice Burroughs I Am a Barbarian
 35805 SF Edgar Rice Burroughs I Am a Barbarian (1978)
 35840 SF Andre Norton Ice Crown (1970)
 35843 SF Andre Norton Ice Crown
 35854 SF Kim Stanley Robinson Icehenge (1984)
 36300 MY Ron Goulart If Dying Was All (1971)
 36321 SF Andre Norton Victory on Janus
 37088 SF Walt Richmond The Probability Corner
 37090 SF Mark Adlard Interface (1971)
 37100 SF Arthur K. Barnes Interplanetary Hunter (1972)
 37106 SF Brian M. Stableford In the Kingdom of the Beasts
 37217 SF Colin Kapp The Ion War (1978)
 37291 SF Andre Norton Iron Cage (1974)
 37365 SF Robert E. Howard The Iron Man
 37381 NA P. Agan Is That Who I Think It Is? Volume 1 (1975)
 37382 NA P. Agan Is That Who I Think It Is? Volume 3 (1976)
 37421 SF H.G. Wells The Island of Dr. Moreau (1977)
 37425 SF Avram Davidson An Island Under the Earth (1969)
 37465 SF Roger Zelazny Isle of the Dead (1969)
 37466 SF Roger Zelazny Isle of the Dead (1974)
 37468 SF Roger Zelazny Isle of the Dead (1976)
 37470 SF Roger Zelazny Isle of the Dead (1982)
 37598 MY Gil Brewer The Devil in Davos: It Takes a Thief#1 (1969)
 37599 MY Gil Brewer Mediterranean Caper: It Takes a Thief#2 (1969)
 37600 MY Gil Brewer Appointment in Cairo: It Takes a Thief#3 (1970)
 37797 SF Esther Friesner Here Be Demons
 38120 SF John Brunner The Jagged Orbit (1969)
 38122 SF John Brunner The Jagged Orbit
 38287 SF Jerry Pournelle The Janissaries
 38536 SF E. C. Tubb The Jester at Scar: Dumarest of Terra#5 (1982)
 38570 SF C. L. Moore Jirel of Joiry
 40590 MY Ron Goulart Too Sweet to Die (1972)
 40850 SF Robert Sheckley The Journey of Joenes
 41550 NA Jerry Bladwin Kept Man (1975)
 41550 SF Andre Norton Judgement on Janus
 41551 SF Andre Norton Judgement on Janus
 41841 NA William Burroughs Junkie (1964)
 42801 SF E. C. Tubb Kalin
 43525 SF Dennis Schmidt Kensho
 43672 SF Andre Norton A Key Out of Time (1978)
 43679 SF Andre Norton A Key Out of Time
 44470 SF Edgar Wallace and Merian C. Cooper King Kong (1976)
 44485 SF Christopher Stasheff King Kobold
 44489 SF Christopher Stasheff King Kobold Revived
 44512 NA Bernhardt Hurwood Kingdom of the Spiders (1977)
 45000 SF Andre Norton Knave of Dreams (1976)
 45001 SF Andre Norton Knave of Dreams
 46272 SF Edgar Rice Burroughs The Lad and the Lion (1978)
 46850 SF Thomas Burnett Swann Lady of the Bees
 46996 SF Edgar Rice Burroughs Land of Terror
 46997 SF Edgar Rice Burroughs Land of Terror
 47000 SF Edgar Rice Burroughs Land of Terror (1978)
 47013 SF Edgar Rice Burroughs The Land of Hidden Men
 47020 SF Edgar Rice Burroughs The Land That Time Forgot
 47022 SF Edgar Rice Burroughs The Land That Time Forgot
 47023 SF Edgar Rice Burroughs The Land That Time Forgot
 47026 SF Edgar Rice Burroughs The Land That Time Forgot
 47042 SF Jack Vance The Languages of Pao
 47161 SF Andre Norton The Last Planet
 47162 SF Andre Norton The Last Planet
 47440 SF Andre Norton Lavender-Green Magic (1977)
 47800 SF Ursula K. Le Guin The Left Hand of Darkness (1969)
 47805 SF Ursula K. Le Guin The Left Hand of Darkness (1976)
 48494 SF H. Beam Piper Little Fuzzy
 48520 SF Fred Saberhagen The Berserker Wars
 48862 NA Charles Fort Lo!
 48877 WE Giles A. Lutz The Lonely Ride
 48918 WE Nelson Nye Long Run
 48970 SF Mack Reynolds Looking Backward, from the Year 2000 (1973)
 49051 SF H. Beam Piper Lord Kalvan of Otherwhen
 49236 SF Andre Norton Lord of Thunder
 49294 SF Edgar Rice Burroughs The Lost Continent
 49501 SF Edgar Rice Burroughs Lost on Venus
 49504 SF Edgar Rice Burroughs Lost on Venus
 49506 SF Edgar Rice Burroughs Lost on Venus
 49507 SF Edgar Rice Burroughs Lost on Venus
 49548 SF Fred Saberhagen Love Conquers All
 49851 SF Allen Steele Orbital Decay
 50485 SF Allen Steele Lunar Descent
 50530 SF Jack Vance Suldrun's Garden (Lyonesse Trilogy Book 1 of 3) (1987)
 50531 SF Jack Vance Madouc (Lyonesse Trilogy book 3 of 3) (1990)
 51356 SF Steve Perry The Machiavelli Interface (1986)
 51388 SF Michael Moorcock The Mad God's Amulet
 51401 SF Edgar Rice Burroughs The Mad King
 51402 SF Edgar Rice Burroughs The Mad King
 51403 SF Edgar Rice Burroughs The Mad King
 51404 SF Edgar Rice Burroughs The Mad King
 51409 SF Edgar Rice Burroughs The Mad King
 51544 SF Larry Niven The Magic Goes Away (1978)
 51550 NA Adeline McElfresh The Magic of Dr. Farrar (1965)
 51590 SF John Eric Holmes Mahars of Pellucidar
 51624 SF Philip José Farmer The Maker of Universes
 51626 NA Rachel Cosgrove Payes Malverne Hall (1970)
 51642 WE Ray Hogan The Man from Barranca Negra
 51647 SF Brian Aldiss The Malacia Tapestry (1976)
 51700 NA David McDaniel The Hollow Crown Affair (1969)
 51701 NA Peter Leslie The Unfair Fare Affair (1968)
 51702 SF Edgar Rice Burroughs The Mad King
 51702 NA John T. Phillifent The Power Cube Affair
 51703 NA John T. Phillifent The Corfu Affair (1967)
 51704 NA Joel Bernard The Thinking Machine Affair (1967)
 51705 NA John Oram Thomas (as John Oram) The Stone-Cold Dead in the Market Affair
 51706 NA Peter Leslie The Finger in the Spy Affair (1966)
 51910 SF Philip K. Dick The Man Who Japed (1975)
 51918 SF Steve Perry The Man Who Never Missed (1986)
 51941 NA Bruce Cassiday The Fire's Center; Marcus Welby#3 (1971)
 51943 SF David Alexander Smith Marathon
 52075 SF Henry Kuttner, Bob Pepper, and Alicia Austin The Mask of Circe (1971)
 52077 SF Fred Saberhagen The Mask of the Sun
 52078 SF Fred Saberhagen The Mask of the Sun
 52110 NA Jennifer Sills Massage Parlor (1973)
 52207 SF Steve Perry Matadora (1986)
 52400 SF John Brunner Meeting at Infinity
 52470 SF Donald A. Wollheim (ed.) Men on the Moon
 52560 SF Alan E. Nourse The Mercy Men
 52740 WE L.P. Homes The Maverick Star (1969)
 52975 SF Gerard F. Conway The Midnight Dancers
 53151 SF John W. Campbell The Mightiest Machine
 53167 SF Algis Budrys, Charles G. Waugh, and Martin Harry Greenberg (eds.) Space Dogfights (1992)
 53183 SF John Varley Millennium
 53299 SF Spider Robinson Mindkiller
 53355 SF Ian Watson Miracle Visitors
 53503 SF Andrew J. Offutt The Mists of Doom
 53540 SF George Zebrowski The Monadic Universe
 53570 SF D. G. Compton The Missionaries (1972)
 53587 SF Edgar Rice Burroughs The Monster Men
 53588 SF Edgar Rice Burroughs The Monster Men
 53591 SF Edgar Rice Burroughs The Monster Men
 53701 SF Edgar Rice Burroughs The Moon Maid
 53702 SF Edgar Rice Burroughs The Moon Maid
 53703 SF Edgar Rice Burroughs The Moon Maid
 53705 SF Edgar Rice Burroughs The Moon Maid
 53719 SF Charles de Lint Moonheart (1984)
 53753 SF Edgar Rice Burroughs The Moon Men
 53756 SF Edgar Rice Burroughs The Moon Men
 53780 SF John W. Campbell The Moon is Hell
 54101 SF Andre Norton Moon of 3 Rings
 54201 SF Thomas Burnett Swann Moondust
 54325 NA Rona Randall Mountain of Fear (1971)
 54378 NA Virginia Coffman Moura (1963)
 54380 NA Virginia Coffman Moura (1963)
 54460 NA Edgar Rice Burroughs The Mucker (1974)
 54462 SF Edgar Rice Burroughs The Mucker (1914)
 54484 SF Charles de Lint Mulengro: A Romany Tale (1985)
 54500 SF Mark Adlard Multiface (1975)
 55145 SF Fritz Leiber You're All Alone (1973)
 55309 SF Fred Saberhagen The Mask of the Sun
 56010 SF Gordon R. Dickson Naked to the Stars
 56940 SF Leigh Brackett The Nemesis from Terra (1976)
 57752 SF Andre Norton Night of Masks
 57975 NA Margaret Summerton Nightingale at Noon
 58024 SF Mark E. Rogers The Nightmare of God (1988)
 58050 SF R. A. Lafferty Nine Hundred Grandmothers (1970)
 58875 NA Jesse Kornbluth Notes from the New Underground (1968)
 60563 SF Edgar Rice Burroughs The Oakdale Affair
 60564 SF Edgar Rice Burroughs The Oakdale Affair
 60739 SF Fred Saberhagen Octagon (1981)
 61480 NA The Editors of Science & Mechanics (compilers) The Official Guide to UFO's (1968)
 62160 SF Fred Saberhagen Old Friend of the Family (1979)
 62380 SF George Zebrowski The Omega Point
 62938 SF Bob Shaw One Million Tomorrows
 63165 SF Kenneth Bulmer On the Symb-Socket Circuit (1972)
 63410 SF Andre Norton Operation Time Search
 63590 SF John Rankine Operation Umanaq (1973)
 63780 SF Bob Shaw Orbitsville
 64146 SF John Dechancie Paradox Alley (1987)
 64240 SF Bob Shaw Other Days, Other Eyes
 64400 SF Philip K. Dick Our Friends from Frolix 8 (1970)
 64401 SF Philip K. Dick Our Friends from Frolix 8 (1977)
 64484 SF Edgar Rice Burroughs Out of Times Abyss
 64512 WE Edgar Rice Burroughs The Outlaw of Torn
 64514 SF Edgar Rice Burroughs The Outlaw of Torn
 65050 SF Bob Shaw The Palace of Eternity
 65125 SF Jack Williamson The Pandora Effect (1969)
 65169 SF H. Beam Piper Paratime (1981)
 65316 SF Larry Niven The Patchwork Girl (1981)
 65353 SF Fred Saberhagen Octagon
 65390 SF Colin Kapp Patterns of Chaos (1978)
 65412 SF Edgar Rice Burroughs The Outlaw of Torn (1973)
 65430 SF Keith Roberts Pavane (1966)
 65442 NA Anne Maybury The Pavilion at Monkshood (1973)
 65852 SF Edgar Rice Burroughs Pellucidar
 65855 SF Edgar Rice Burroughs Pellucidar
 65873 NA Eliot Asinof People vs. Blutcher (1971)
 65890 SF Jack Williamson People Machines
 65941 SF Edgar Rice Burroughs The People That Time Forgot
 65942 SF Edgar Rice Burroughs The People That Time Forgot
 65946 SF Edgar Rice Burroughs The People That Time Forgot
 65948 SF Mack Reynolds Perchance to Dream
 66050 MY Cornell Woolrich Phantom Lady
 66100 SF Avram Davidson The Phoenix and the Mirror
 66141 SF Walt Richmond and Leigh Richmond Phase 2
 66201 SF Joanna Russ Picnic on Paradise
 66320 SF Robert E. Howard Pigeons from Hell (1978)
 66502 SF Edgar Rice Burroughs Pirates of Venus
 66503 SF Edgar Rice Burroughs Pirates of Venus
 66505 SF Edgar Rice Burroughs Pirates of Venus
 66509 SF Edgar Rice Burroughs Pirates of Venus
 66833 SF Andre Norton Plague Ship (1973)
 66900 SF Jack Vance Planet of Adventure#2: Servants of the Wankh
 66901 SF Jack Vance Planet of Adventure#3: The Dirdir (1969)
 66902 SF Jack Vance Planet of Adventure#4: The Pnume (1970)
 66952 SF Ursula K. Le Guin Planet of Exile
 67020 SF Marion Zimmer Bradley The Planet Savers
 67025 SF Marion Zimmer Bradley The Planet Savers and The Sword of Aldones
 67060 SF John Jakes The Planet Wizard
 67061 SF John Jakes The Planet Wizard
 67110 MY Jack Vance (as John Holbrook Vance) The Pleasant Grove Murder
 67131 WE L. L. Foreman Plundering Gun
 67145 SF Michael Kurland Pluribus
 67402 SF Robert A. Heinlein Podkayne of Mars
 67555 SF Andre Norton Postmarked the Stars (1969)
 67800 SF Philip K. Dick The Preserving Machine (1969)
 67801 SF Philip K. Dick The Preserving Machine (1976)
 67900 SF Thomas M. Disch The Prisoner (1969)
 67901 SF David McDaniel The Prisoner#2
 67902 SF Hank Stine The Prisoner#3 (1970)
 67937 SF L. Sprague de Camp The Prisoner of Zhamanak
 68023 SF Gordon R. Dickson Pro
 68305 SF Stephen Robinette Projections
 69168 SF Arsen Darnay The Purgatory Zone (1981)
 69190 SF L. Sprague de Camp The Purple Pterodactyls: The Adventures of Wilson Newbury, Ensorcelled Financier (1980)
 69540 SF D. G. Compton The Quality of Mercy
 69658 SF L. Sprague de Camp The Queen of Zamba
 69681 SF Andre Norton Quest Crosstime
 69682 SF Andre Norton Quest Crosstime
 69683 SF Andre Norton Quest Crosstime
 69684 SF Andre Norton Quest Crosstime
 69700 SF A. E. van Vogt Quest for the Future
 69770 SF Poul Anderson Question and Answer
 69992 SF Jack L. Chalker Quintara Marathon#1: The Demons at Rainbow Bridge
 71000 NA Manfred von Richthofen The Red Baron (1969)
 71001 NA Manfred von Richthofen The Red Baron
 71065 SF Alfred Coppel (as Robert Cham Gilman) The Rebel of Rhada (1968)
 71076 WE Clifton Adams Reckless Men
 71083 SF E. C. Tubb Lallia: Dumarest of Terra#6 (1982)
 71100 SF Andre Norton Red Hart Magic (1979)
 71140 SF Robert A. Heinlein Red Planet
 71156 SF David C. Smith and Richard L. Tierney The Ring of Ikribu: Red Sonja#1 (1981)
 71157 SF David C. Smith and Richard L. Tierney Demon Night: Red Sonja#2 (1982)
 71158 SF David C. Smith and Richard L. Tierney When Hell Laughs: Red Sonja#3 (1982)
 71159 SF David C. Smith and Richard L. Tierney Endithor's Daughter: Red Sonja#4 (1982)
 71160 SF D. D. Chapman and Deloris Lehman Tarzan Red Tide
 71161 SF David C. Smith and Richard L. Tierney Against the Prince of Hell: Red Sonja#5 (1983)
 71162 SF David C. Smith and Richard L. Tierney Star of Doom: Red Sonja#6 (1983)
 71335 SF Philip José Farmer Behind the Walls of Terra (1970)
 71435 SF John T. Sladek Mechasm
 71500 SF A. E. van Vogt The Silkie
 71502 SF Keith Laumer Retief at Large
 71803 SF E. C. Tubb Lallia
 71816 WE Edgar Rice Burroughs The Return of the Mucker
 71816 NA Edgar Rice Burroughs The Return of the Mucker
 72280 NA Edgar Rice Burroughs The Rider (1915)
 72360 WE John Callahan Ride the Wild Land & Jernigan (1965)
 73293 SF Ursula K. Le Guin Rocannon's World
 73330 SF Robert A. Heinlein Rocket Ship Galileo
 73425 WE L. L. Foreman Rogue's Legacy (1968)
 73438 SF Kenneth Bulmer Roller Coaster World
 73440 SF Robert A. Heinlein The Rolling Stones
 73441 SF Robert A. Heinlein The Rolling Stones
 73450 SF Mack Reynolds Rolltown
 73471 NA Monica Dickens The Room Upstairs
 73532 SF Andre Norton Secret of the Lost Race
 74860 SF Robert A. Heinlein To Sail Beyond the Sunset
 74981 SF Andre Norton Sargasso of Space
 74982 SF Andre Norton Sargasso of Space
 75045 SF Mack Reynolds Satellite City
 75131 SF Edgar Rice Burroughs Savage Pellucidar
 75134 SF Edgar Rice Burroughs Savage Pellucidar
 75136 SF Edgar Rice Burroughs Savage Pellucidar
 75181 NA Jean Vicary Saverstall
 75441 SF Sam J. Lundwall Science Fiction: What It's All About (1977)
 75617 WE Ray Hogan Showdown on Texas Flat
 75690 SF George Bamber The Sea Is Boiling Hot
 75695 SF Andre Norton Sea Siege
 75696 SF Andre Norton Sea Siege
 75750 NA Sax Rohmer The Secret of Holm Peel and Other Strange Stories (1970)
 75800 SF George Bamber The Sea Is Boiling Hot (1971)
 75830 SF Andre Norton Secret of the Lost Race
 75831 SF Andre Norton Secret of the Lost Race
 75832 SF Andre Norton Secret of the Lost Race
 75833 SF Andre Norton Secret of the Lost Race (1978)
 75834 SF Andre Norton Secret of the Lost Race (1981)
 75835 SF Andre Norton Secret of the Lost Race
 75836 SF Andre Norton Secret of the Lost Race
 75860 SF Mack Reynolds Section G: United Planets
 75875 SF Robert Silverberg The Seeds of Earth
 75894 SF Eric Frank Russell Sentinels from Space
 75940 SF Marion Zimmer Bradley Seven from the Stars
 75945 MY Ron Goulart The Same Lie Twice (1973)
 75958 NA Brad Steiger Sex and Satanism (1969)
 75980 NA Barbara Levins Sexual Power of Marijuana
 75987 NA Ruth Abbey The Shadow Between (1974)
 76015 WE Robert Mccaig The Shadow Maker (1970)
 76098 SF Bob Shaw Ship of Strangers
 76099 SF Robert E. Howard The She Devil (1983)
 76181 NA Louis L'Amour (as Jim Mayo) Showdown at Yellow Butte
 76219 SF Robert Silverberg and Randall Garrett (jointly as Robert Randall) The Shrouded Planet (1982)
 76343 SF Charles Sheffield Sight of Proteus
 76385 SF D. G. Compton The Silent Multitude
 76390 SF Robert Silverberg The Silent Invaders
 76391 SF Robert Silverberg The Silent Invaders (1977)
 76500 SF A. E. van Vogt The Silkie
 76501 SF A. E. van Vogt The Silkie
 76502 SF A. E. van Vogt The Silkie
 76701 SF Philip K. Dick The Simulacra (1976)
 76801 SF Andre Norton The Sioux Spaceman
 76802 SF Andre Norton The Sioux Spaceman
 76836 SF Walt Richmond and Leigh Richmond Siva! (1979)
 76942 SF Harry Harrison Skyfall (1978)
 76972 NA Dorothy Eden Sleep in the Woods (1967)
 77051 NA Margaret Erskine Sleep No More
 77408 SF Rudy Rucker Software
 77410 SF Philip K. Dick Solar Lottery (1974)
 77411 SF Philip K. Dick Solar Lottery (1975)
 77419 SF Gordon R. Dickson Soldier, Ask Not (1982)
 77425 NA Betty Deforrest The Shows of Yesterday
 77427 SF Brian Herbert (ed.) The Poetry of Frank Herbert: Songs of Muad'dib
 77471 NA Anne Maybury Someone Waiting (1961)
 77520 WE Wayne Lee Son of a Gunman
 77551 SF Andre Norton Sorceress of the Witch World
 77554 SF Andre Norton Sorceress of the Witch World (1968)
 77598 NA Kenneth Von Gunden The Sounding Stillness
 77620 SF Robert E. Howard The Sowers of the Thunder (1979)
 77730 SF Robert A. Heinlein Space Cadet
 77780 SF H. Beam Piper Space Viking
 77782 SF Mack Reynolds Space Visitor
 77783 SF Mack Reynolds Space Visitor
 77791 SF Fred Saberhagen Specimens
 77841 NA S.E. Stevenson Spring Magic
 77905 NA Jane Blackmore The Square of Many Colours
 77918 WE James Powell Stage to Seven Springs
 77953 SF Marion Zimmer Bradley Star of Danger
 78000 SF Robert A. Heinlein The Star Beast
 78011 SF Andre Norton Star Born
 78035 SF Keith Laumer Star Colony
 78071 SF Andre Norton Star Gate
 78318 SF Pamela Sargent Starshadows
 78432 SF Andre Norton The Stars Are Ours
 78477 SF Gerry Turnbull (ed.) A Star Trek Catalog: The Complete Guide to the Fantastic World of Star Trek (1979)
 78479 SF Ben Bova Star Watchman
 78500 NA Warren Smith Strange & Miraculous Cures (1969)
 78565 SF John Varley Steel Beach
 78575 SF D. G. Compton The Steel Crocodile (1970)
 78585 SF Jerry Pournelle A Step Farther Out
 78650 SF Philip José Farmer The Stone God Awakens (1970)
 78651 SF Philip José Farmer The Stone God Awakens (1973)
 78652 SF Philip José Farmer The Stone God Awakens (1975)
 78653 SF Philip José Farmer The Stone God Awakens (1979)
 78654 SF Philip José Farmer The Stone God Awakens (1980)
 78657 SF Poul Anderson Dominic Flandry: A Stone in Heaven
 78741 SF Andre Norton Storm Over Warlock
 78742 SF Andre Norton Storm Over Warlock (1973)
 78830 WE Giles A. Lutz The Stranger
 78901 NA Brad Steiger Strange Guests (1966)
 79001 NA Bernhardt J. Hurwood Strange Talents
 79034 SF Robert A. Heinlein Stranger in a Strange Land
 79112 SF Marion Zimmer Bradley Survey Ship
 79141 SF Leigh Brackett The Sword of Rhiannon
 79150 SF Fritz Leiber Swords Against Death
 79157 SF Fritz Leiber Swords Against Death
 79161 SF Fritz Leiber Swords Against Wizardry
 79165 SF Fritz Leiber Swords Against Wizardry
 79170 SF Fritz Leiber Swords and Deviltry
 79176 SF Fritz Leiber Swords and Deviltry
 79181 SF Fritz Leiber Swords in the Mist
 79185 SF Fritz Leiber Swords in the Mist
 79221 SF Fritz Leiber The Swords of Lankhmar
 79222 SF Fritz Leiber The Swords of Lankhmar
 79431 SF Andre Norton The Stars Are Ours
 79791 SF Edgar Rice Burroughs Tanar of Pellucidar
 79797 SF Edgar Rice Burroughs Tanar of Pellucidar
 79805 WE Roy Manning Tangled Trail
 79854 SF Edgar Rice Burroughs Tarzan at the Earth's Core
 79970 NA Isobel Lambot A Taste of Murder
 80010 SF William Shatner Teklords
 80011 SF William Shatner Teklab
 80012 SF William Shatner Tekvengeance
 80180 SF James Tiptree, Jr. Ten Thousand Light-Years from Home
 80208 SF William Shatner Tekwar
 80400 WE Nelson Nye The Texas Gun
 80575 WE Nelson Nye Thief River
 80661 NA Mildred Davis The Third Half
 80680 SF Robert Lory The Thirteen Bracelets
 80691 SF Roger Zelazny This Immortal
 80705 SF Robert E. Howard Tigers of the Sea
 80780 SF Robert E. Howard Three-Bladed Doom (1979)
 80801 SF Andre Norton Three Against the Witch World
 80805 SF Andre Norton Three Against the Witch World (1978)
 80855 SF Alexei Panshin The Thurb Revolution (1978)
 80933 SF Spider Robinson Time Pressure (1988)
 81000 SF Clifford D. Simak Time & Again
 81001 SF Clifford D. Simak Time & Again
 81012 SF Keith Laumer The Time Bender
 81125 SF Robert A. Heinlein Time for the Stars
 81126 SF Robert A. Heinlein Time for the Stars
 81251 SF Andre Norton The Time Traders
 81253 SF Andre Norton The Time Traders
 81254 SF Andre Norton The Time Traders (1984)
 81270 SF John Brunner Times Without Number (1969)
 81277 SF Spider Robinson Time Travelers Strictly Cash (1981)
 81656 SF Bob Shaw Tomorrow Lies in Ambush
 81670 SF Mack Reynolds Tomorrow Might Be Different
 81900 SF Thomas Burnett Swann The Tournament of Thorns
 81973 SF E. C. Tubb Toyman: Dumarest of Terra#3
 82210 SF John Brunner The Traveler in Black
 82355 SF Andre Norton Trey of Swords (1978)
 82401 WE Ernest Haycox Trigger Trio
 82410 WE D. B. Newton Triple Trouble
 82430 WE Nelson Nye Trouble at Quinn's Crossing
 82660 SF Robert A. Heinlein Tunnel in the Sky
 84000 SF Andre Norton Uncharted Stars
 84292 SF H. Beam Piper Uller Uprising
 84331 SF John W. Campbell The Ultimate Weapon
 84514 SF Andrew Offutt The Undying Wizard
 84569 SF Axel Madsen Unisave
 84581 SF A. E. van Vogt The Universe Maker
 85456 SF Alan E. Nourse The Universe Between (1987)
 85460 NA Harold E. Hartney Up & At 'Em
 86022 NA Virginia Coffman Vampire of Moura
 86050 SF Philip K. Dick The Variable Man and Other Stories (1976)
 86064 SF Fred Saberhagen The Veils of Azlaroc
 86065 SF Fred Saberhagen The Veils of Azlaroc
 86180 SF E. C. Tubb Veruchia
 86181 SF E. C. Tubb Veruchia: Dumarest of Terra#8 (1982)
 86190 SF Ian Watson Very Slow Time Machine
 86607 SF Mark Adlard Volteface (1972)
 86608 SF Philip K. Dick Vulcan's Hammer (1972)
 86610 SF Andre Norton, Wojciech Siudmak, and Alicia Austin Voorloper (1980)
 87015 NA Philip Loraine One to Curtis (1967)
 87060 SF Michael Moorcock The Warlord of the Air (1971)
 87070 NA Daoma Winston Walk Around the Square (1975)
 87101 NA Rona Randall Walk Into My Parlor
 87180 SF A. E. van Vogt The War Against the Rull
 87201 SF Poul Anderson War of the Wing-Men
 87269 SF George Zebrowski Ashes & Stars
 87300 SF Christopher Shasheff The Warlock in Spite of Himself
 87301 SF Christopher Shasheff The Warlock in Spite of Himself
 87319 SF Andre Norton Warlock of the Witch World
 87321 SF Andre Norton Warlock of the Witch World
 87322 SF Andre Norton Warlock of the Witch World
 87323 SF Andre Norton Warlock of the Witch World (1978)
 87325 SF Christopher Stasheff Warlock Unlocked
 87328 SF Christopher Stasheff Warlock Unlocked
 87332 SF Christopher Stasheff Warlock Unlocked
 87370 NA Herman Raucher Watermelon Man
 87600 SF Michael Moorcock The Warlord of the Air (1973)
 87625 SF Dennis Schmidt Way-Farer
 87631 SF H.G. Wells The War of the Worlds (1988)
 87718 MY Harlan Ellison Web of the City (1983)
 87855 SF A. E. van Vogt The Weapons Shops of Isher
 87873 SF Andre Norton Web of the Witch World
 87874 SF Andre Norton Web of the Witch World
 87875 SF Andre Norton Web of the Witch World
 87941 SF Thomas Burnett Swann The Weirwoods
 88010 WE T.V. Olsen Westward They Rode
 88065 SF Edmond Hamilton What's It Like Out There? (And Other Stories)
 88075 NA Richard Lamparski Whatever Became Of.....? Volume I
 88076 NA Richard Lamparski Whatever Became Of.....? Volume II (1970)
 88091 SF H. G. Wells When the Sleeper Wakes
 88270 SF Thomas Burnett Swann Where Is the Bird of Fire? (1970)
 88440 NA Nelle McFather Whispering Island
 88554 NA Dorothy Eden Whistle for the Grows
 88564 SF Rudy Rucker White Light
 88601 SF Clifford D. Simak Why Call Them Back from Heaven?
 89237 SF Philip José Farmer The Wind Whales of Ishmael
 89251 SF Marion Zimmer Bradley The Winds of Darkover
 89701 SF Andre Norton Witch World
 89702 SF Andre Norton Witch World
 89851 SF James H. Schmitz The Witches of Karres
 90050 NA Charles Lefebure Witness to Witchcraft (1970)
 90075 SF Ursula K. Le Guin A Wizard of Earthsea
 90110 NA Georgette Heyer Venetia (1958)
 90190 SF Edgar Rice Burroughs The Wizard of Venus and Pirate Blood
 90191 SF Edgar Rice Burroughs The Wizard of Venus (1973)
 90194 SF Edgar Rice Burroughs The Wizard of Venus and Pirate Blood
 90426 WE Lee Hoffman Gunfight at Laramie
 90701 NA Robert J. Hogan The Wolver
 90872 SF R.A. Salvatore The Woods Out Back
 90926 SF Frank Herbert The Worlds of Frank Herbert (1971)
 90951 SF Philip K. Dick The World Jones Made (1975)
 90955 SF Jack Vance The Worlds of Jack Vance
 91010 SF Gregory Frost Lyrec (1984)
 91052 SF John Carr (ed.) The Worlds of H. Beam Piper
 91055 SF Poul Anderson The Worlds of Poul Anderson
 91060 SF Theodore Sturgeon The Worlds of Theodore Sturgeon
 91170 SF Marion Zimmer Bradley The World Wreckers
 91352 SF Donald A. Wollheim and Terry Carr (eds.) World's Best Science Fiction, 1969
 91353 SF Donald A. Wollheim and Terry Carr (eds.) World's Best Science Fiction, First Series
 91354 SF Donald A. Wollheim and Terry Carr (eds.) World's Best Science Fiction, Second Series
 91355 SF Donald A. Wollheim and Terry Carr (eds.) World's Best Science Fiction, Third Series
 91356 SF Donald A. Wollheim and Terry Carr (eds.) World's Best Science Fiction, Fourth Series
 91357 SF Donald A. Wollheim and Terry Carr (eds.) World's Best Science Fiction, 1970
 91358 SF Donald A. Wollheim and Terry Carr (eds.) World's Best Science Fiction, 1971
 91359 SF Frederik Pohl Best Sf for 1972
 91502 SF Robert A. Heinlein The Worlds of Robert A. Heinlein (1973)
 91581 SF Keith Laumer Worlds of the Imperium
 91640 SF Fritz Leiber The Worlds of Fritz Leiber
 91706 SF Poul Anderson World Without Stars
 91770 SF Robert E. Howard Worms of the Earth
 92551 SF Andre Norton The X Factor
 92553 SF Andre Norton The X Factor
 94200 SF Wilson Tucker The Year of the Quiet Sun (1970)
 94251 SF Andre Norton Year of the Unicorn
 94254 SF Andre Norton Year of the Unicorn (1979)
 95490 SF Andre Norton Zarsthor's Bane (1978)
 95501 NA Arch Whitehouse The Zeppelin Fighters
 95941 SF Andre Norton Zarsthor's Bane
 95960 SF Andre Norton The Zero Stone
 95961 SF Andre Norton The Zero Stone
 95964 SF Andre Norton The Zero Stone (1981)

Single Volumes